This is a list of the present and extant Barons (Lords of Parliament, in Scottish terms) in the Peerages of England, Scotland, Great Britain, Ireland, and the United Kingdom. Note that it does not include those extant baronies which have become merged (either through marriage or elevation) with higher peerage dignities and are today only seen as subsidiary titles. For a more complete list, which adds these "hidden" baronies as well as extinct, dormant, abeyant, and forfeit ones, see List of Baronies.

This page includes all life barons, including the Law Lords created under the Appellate Jurisdiction Act 1876. However hereditary peers with the rank of viscount or higher holding also a life peerage are not included.

Order of precedence

The general order of precedence among barons is:
 Barons of England
 Lords of Parliament of Scotland
 Barons of Great Britain
 Barons of Ireland
 Barons of the United Kingdom
However barons of Ireland created after the Union of 1801 yield precedence to earlier created barons of the United Kingdom. They are listed in italics, in their place in the order of precedence. Life peers take precedence with other barons of the United Kingdom; they are listed separately because the only hereditary baronies created since 1965 have been subsidiary titles: Prince Andrew, Duke of York, who holds the subsidiary title of Baron Killyleagh, Prince William, Duke of Cambridge, who holds the subsidiary title of Baron Carrickfergus, and Prince Harry, Duke of Sussex, who holds the subsidiary title of Baron Kilkeel.

Barons of England
The Baron de Ros (1264) 
Peter Maxwell, 27th Baron de Ros
The Baron Mowbray (1283), Segrave (1295) and Stourton (1448)  
James Charles Peter Stourton, 28th Baron Mowbray
The Baron Hastings (1295)
Delaval Astley, 23rd Baron Hastings
The Baron FitzWalter (1295)
Julian Plumptre, 22nd Baron FitzWalter
The Baron Clinton (1299)
Gerald Fane-Trefusis, 22nd Baron Clinton
The Baron de Clifford (1299)
Miles Russell, 28th Baron de Clifford
The Baron Zouche (1308)
William Frankland, 19th Baron Zouche
The Baroness Willoughby de Eresby (1313)
Jane Heathcote-Drummond-Willoughby, 28th Baroness Willoughby de Eresby
The Baron Strabolgi (1318)
Andrew Kenworthy, 12th Baron Strabolgi
The Baroness Dacre (1321)
Emily Douglas-Home, 29th Baroness Dacre
The Baron Darcy de Knayth (1332)
Casper Ingrams, 19th Baron Darcy de Knayth
The Baron Cromwell (1375)
Godfrey John Bewicke-Copley, 7th Baron Cromwell
The Baron Camoys (1383)
William Stonor, 8th Baron Camoys
The Baron Grey of Codnor (1397)
Richard Cornwall-Legh, 6th Baron Grey of Codnor
The Baron Berkeley (1421) and Gueterbock (UK life, 2000)
Anthony Gueterbock, 18th Baron Berkeley, Baron Gueterbock
The Baron Latymer (1432)
Crispin James Alan Nevill Money-Coutts, 9th Baron Latymer
The Baron Dudley (1440)
Jim Anthony Hill Wallace, 15th Baron Dudley
The Baron Saye and Sele (1447)
Nathaniel Fiennes, 21st Baron Saye and Sele
The Baron Berners (1455)
Rupert Kirkham, 17th Baron Berners
The Baron Herbert (1461)
David Seyfried-Herbert, 19th Baron Herbert
The Baron Willoughby de Broke (1491)
Leopold Verney, 21st Baron Willoughby de Broke
The Baron Vaux of Harrowden (1523)
Richard Gilbey, 12th Baron Vaux of Harrowden
The Baroness Braye (1529)
Mary Aubrey-Fletcher, 8th Baroness Braye
The Baron Burgh (1529)
Alexander Leith, 8th Baron Burgh
The Baron Wharton (1544)
Myles Robertson, 12th Baron Wharton
The Baron St John of Bletso (1559)
Anthony St John, 22nd Baron St John of Bletso
The Baroness Howard de Walden (1597)
Hazel Czernin, 10th Baroness Howard de Walden
The Baron Petre (1603)
John Petre, 18th Baron Petre
The Baron Dormer (1615)
William Dormer, 18th Baron Dormer
The Baron Teynham (1616)
David Roper-Curzon, 21st Baron Teynham
The Baron Strange (1628)
Adam Drummond of Megginch, 17th Baron Strange
The Baron Stafford (1640)
Francis Fitzherbert, 15th Baron Stafford
The Baron Byron (1643)
Robert Byron, 13th Baron Byron
The Baron Lucas (1663) and The Lord Dingwall (Sc, 1609) (known as the Lord Lucas and Dingwall)
Ralph Palmer, 12th Baron Lucas and 8th Lord Dingwall
The Baroness Arlington (1664)
Jennifer Forwood, 11th Baroness Arlington
The Baron Clifford of Chudleigh (1672)
Thomas Clifford, 14th Baron Clifford of Chudleigh
The Baron Barnard (1698)
Henry Francis Cecil Vane, 12th Baron Barnard

Lords of Parliament of Scotland
The Lord Forbes (1442)
Malcolm Forbes, 23rd Lord Forbes
The Lord Gray (1444)
Andrew Campbell-Gray, 23rd Lord Gray
The Lady Saltoun (1445)
Flora Fraser, 21st Lady Saltoun
The Lord Sinclair (1449)
Matthew Murray Kennedy St Clair, 18th Lord Sinclair
The Lord Borthwick (1452)
John Borthwick, 24th Lord Borthwick
The Lord Lovat (1464)
Simon Fraser, 16th Lord Lovat, 5th Baron Lovat
The Lord Sempill (1488)
James William Stuart Whitemore Sempill, 21st Lord Sempill
The Lady Herries of Terregles (1490)
Jane Kerr, Marchioness of Lothian, 16th Lady Herries of Terregles
The Lord Elphinstone (1510)
Alexander Elphinstone, 19th Lord Elphinstone, 5th Baron Elphinstone
The Lord Torphichen (1564)
James Sandilands, 15th Lord Torphichen
The Lady Kinloss (1602)
Teresa Freeman-Grenville, 13th Lady Kinloss
The Lady Balfour of Burleigh (1607)
Victoria Bruce-Winkler, 9th Lady Balfour of Burleigh
The Lord Dingwall (1609) and The Baron Lucas (Eng, 1663), (known as the Lord Lucas and Dingwall)
Ralph Palmer, 8th Lord Dingwall and 12th Baron Lucas
The Lord Napier (1627) and The Baron Ettrick (UK, 1872) (known as the Lord Napier and Ettrick)
Francis Napier, 15th Lord Napier, 6th Baron Ettrick
The Lord Fairfax of Cameron (1627)
Nicholas Fairfax, 14th Lord Fairfax of Cameron
The Lord Reay (1628)
Aeneas Mackay, 15th Lord Reay
The Lord Elibank (1643)
Robert Erskine-Murray, 15th Lord Elibank
The Lord Belhaven and Stenton (1647)
Frederick Hamilton, 14th Lord Belhaven and Stenton
The Lord Rollo (1651)
David Rollo, 14th Lord Rollo
The Lord Polwarth (1690)
Andrew Hepburne-Scott, 11th Lord Polwarth

Barons of Great Britain
The Baron Middleton (1712)
Michael Charles James Willoughby, 13th Baron Middleton
The Baron Walpole (1723)
Jonathan Walpole, 11th Baron Walpole
The Baron Monson (1728)
Nicholas Monson, 12th Baron Monson
The Baron Boston (1761)
George Boteler Irby, 11th Baron Boston
The Baron Vernon (1762)
Anthony Vernon-Harcourt, 11th Baron Vernon
The Baron Digby (1765)
Henry Noel Kenelm Digby, 13th Baron Digby
The Baron Hawke (1776)
William Martin Theodore Hawke, 12th Baron Hawke
The Baron Brownlow (1776)
Peregrine Cust, 8th Baron Brownlow
The Baron Foley (1776)
Thomas Foley, 9th Baron Foley
The Baron Dynevor (1780)
Hugo Rhys, 10th Baron Dynevor
The Baron Walsingham (1780)
John de Grey, 9th Baron Walsingham
The Baron Bagot (1780)
Charles Bagot, 10th Baron Bagot
The Baron Southampton (1780)
Edward FitzRoy, 7th Baron Southampton
The Baron Grantley (1782)
Richard Norton, 8th Baron Grantley
The Baron Rodney (1782)
Johnny Rodney, 11th Baron Rodney
The Baron Somers (1784)
Philip Somers-Cocks, 9th Baron Somers
The Baron Suffield (1786)
John Harbord-Hamond, 13th Baron Suffield
The Baron Kenyon (1788)
Nicholas Tyrell-Kenyon, 7th Baron Kenyon
The Baron Braybrooke (1788)
Richard Neville, 11th Baron Braybrooke
The Baron Thurlow (1792)
Roualeyn Hovell-Thurlow-Cumming-Bruce, 9th Baron Thurlow
The Baron Auckland (1793)
Robert Eden, 10th Baron Auckland
The Baron Carrington (1797)
Rupert Carington, 7th Baron Carrington
The Baron Bolton (1797)
Harry Orde-Powlett, 8th Baron Bolton
The Baron Lilford (1797)
Mark Powys, 8th Baron Lilford

Barons of Ireland
The Baron Kingsale (1340?)
Nevinson de Courcy, 31st Baron Kingsale
The Baron Dunsany (1439?)
Randal Plunkett, 21st Baron of Dunsany
The Baron Trimlestown (1462)
Raymond Barnewall, 21st Baron Trimlestown
The Baron Dunboyne (1541)
Richard Butler, 20th/30th Baron Dunboyne
The Baron Louth (1541)
Jonathan Plunkett, 17th Baron Louth
The Baron Inchiquin (1543)
Conor Myles John O'Brien, 18th Baron Inchiquin
The Baron Digby (1620)
Henry Digby, 13th Baron Digby
The Baron Carbery (1715)
Michael Evans-Freke, 12th Baron Carbery
The Baron Aylmer (1718)
Julian Aylmer, 14th Baron Aylmer
The Baron Farnham (1756)
Simon Maxwell, 13th Baron Farnham
The Baron Lisle (1758)
Nicholas Lysaght, 9th Baron Lisle
The Baron Newborough (1776)
Robert Wynn, 8th Baron Newborough
The Baron Macdonald (1776)
Godfrey Macdonald, 8th Baron Macdonald
The Baron Kensington (1776)
Hugh Edwardes, 8th Baron Kensington
The Baron Massy (1776)
David Massy, 10th Baron Massy
The Baron Muskerry (1781)
Robert Deane, 9th Baron Muskerry
The Baron Sheffield (1783), Stanley of Alderley (UK, 1839) and Eddisbury (UK, 1848) (known as the Lord Stanley of Alderley)
Thomas Stanley, 8th Baron Stanley of Alderley, 7th Baron Eddisbury, 8th Baron Sheffield
The Baron Kilmaine (1789)
John Browne, 8th Baron Kilmaine
The Baron Auckland (1789)
Robert Eden, 10th Baron Auckland
The Baron Waterpark (1792)
Roderick Cavendish, 8th Baron Waterpark
The Baron Graves (1794)
Timothy Graves, 10th Baron Graves
The Baron Huntingfield (1796)
Joshua Vanneck, 7th Baron Huntingfield
The Baron Carrington (1796)
Rupert Carington, 7th Baron Carrington
The Baron Rossmore (1796)
Benedict Westenra, 8th Baron Rossmore
The Baron Hotham (1797)
Henry Hotham, 8th Baron Hotham
The Baron Crofton (1797)
Edward Crofton, 8th Baron Crofton
The Baron ffrench (1798)
Robuck ffrench, 8th Baron ffrench
The Baron Henley (1799) and Northington (UK,1885) (known as the Lord Henley)
Oliver Eden, 8th Baron Henley, 6th Baron Northington
The Baron Langford (1800)
Owain Rowley-Conwy, 10th Baron Langford
The Baron Dufferin and Claneboye (1800)
John Blackwood, 11th Baron Dufferin and Claneboye
The Baron Henniker (1800) and Hartismere (UK,1886) (known as the Lord Henniker)
Mark Henniker-Major, 9th Baron Henniker
The Baron Ventry (1800)
Andrew de Moleyns, 8th Baron Ventry
The Baron Dunalley (1800)
Henry Prittie, 7th Baron Dunalley
The Baron Clanmorris (1800)
Simon Bingham, 8th Baron Clanmorris
The Baron Ashtown (1800)
Roderick Trench, 8th Baron Ashtown
The Baron Rendlesham (1806)
Charles Thellusson, 9th Baron Rendlesham
The Baron Castlemaine (1812)
Roland Handcock, 8th Baron Castlemaine
The Baron Decies (1812)
Marcus Beresford, 7th Baron Decies
The Baron Garvagh (1818)
Spencer Canning, 6th Baron Garvagh
The Baron Talbot of Malahide (1831)
Richard Arundell, 11th Baron Talbot of Malahide
The Baron Carew (1834, and UK 1838)
Patrick Conolly-Carew, 7th Baron Carew
The Baron Oranmore and Browne (1836) and Mereworth (UK, 1926) (known as the Lord Oranmore and Browne)
Dominick Browne, 5th Baron Oranmore and Browne
The Baron Bellew (1847)
Bryan Bellew, 8th Baron Bellew
The Baron Fermoy (1856)
Maurice Roche, 6th Baron Fermoy
The Baron Rathdonnell (1868)
Thomas McClintock-Bunbury, 5th Baron Rathdonnell

Barons of the United Kingdom

Irish baronies created after 1801 yield precedence to older Baronies of the United Kingdom.

The Baron Ellenborough (1802)
Rupert Law, 9th Baron Ellenborough
The Baron Rendlesham
The Baron Manners (1807)
John Manners, 6th Baron Manners
The Baron Castlemaine
The Baron Decies
The Baron Churchill (1815)
Michael Spencer, 7th Baron Churchill
The Baron Harris (1815)
Anthony Harris, 8th Baron Harris
The Baron Garvagh (1818)
The Baron Ravensworth (1821)
Thomas Liddell, 9th Baron Ravensworth
The Baron Delamere (1821)
Hugh Cholmondeley, 5th Baron Delamere
The Baron Forester (1821)
Charles Weld-Forester, 9th Baron Forester
The Baron Rayleigh (1821)
John Gerald Strutt, 6th Baron Rayleigh
The Baron Gifford (1824)
Anthony Gifford, 6th Baron Gifford
The Baron Feversham (1826)
Jasper Duncombe, 7th Baron Feversham
The Baron Seaford (1826)
Colin Ellis, 6th Baron Seaford
The Baron Plunket (1827)
Tyrone Plunket, 9th Baron Plunket
The Baron Heytesbury (1828)
James à Court, 7th Baron Heytesbury
The Baron Skelmersdale (1828)
Andrew Bootle-Wilbraham, 8th Baron Skelmersdale
The Baron Wynford (1829)
John Best, 9th Baron Wynford
The Baron Talbot of Malahide
The Baron Kilmarnock (1831)
Robin Boyd, 8th Baron Kilmarnock
The Baron Poltimore (1831)
Mark Bampfylde, 7th Baron Poltimore
The Baron Mostyn (1831)
Gregory Mostyn, 7th Baron Mostyn
The Baron de Saumarez (1831)
Eric Saumarez, 7th Baron de Saumarez
The Baron Denman (1834)
Richard Denman, 6th Baron Denman
The Baron Carew
The Baron Abinger (1835)
James Scarlett, 9th Baron Abinger
The Baron Ashburton (1835)
Mark Baring, 8th Baron Ashburton
The Baron Hatherton (1835)
Edward Littleton, 8th Baron Hatherton
The Baron Stratheden and Campbell (1836)
David Campbell, 7th Baron Stratheden and Campbell
The Baron Oranmore and Browne
The Baron de Mauley (1838)
Rupert Ponsonby, 7th Baron de Mauley
The Baron Wrottesley (1838)
Clifton Wrottesley, 6th Baron Wrottesley
The Baron Sudeley (1838)
Nicholas Hanbury-Tracy, 8th Baron Sudeley
The Baron Methuen (1838)
James Methuen-Campbell, 8th Baron Methuen
The Baron Leigh (1839)
Christopher Leigh, 6th Baron Leigh
The Baron Monteagle of Brandon (1839)
Charles Spring Rice, 7th Baron Monteagle of Brandon
The Baron Congleton (1841)
John Parnell, 9th Baron Congleton
The Baron Vivian (1841)
Charles Vivian, 7th Baron Vivian
The Baron Bellew
The Baron Londesborough (1850)
Richard Denison, 9th Baron Londesborough
The Baron de Freyne (1851)
Fulke French, 8th Baron de Freyne
The Baron Raglan (1852)
Geoffrey Somerset, 6th Baron Raglan
The Baron Belper (1856)
Richard Strutt, 5th Baron Belper
The Baron Fermoy
The Baron Chesham (1858)
Charles Cavendish, 7th Baron Chesham
The Baron Churston (1858)
Benjamin Francis Anthony Yarde-Buller, 6th Baron Churston
The Baron Leconfield (1859) and Egremont (1963) (known as the Lord Egremont)
Max Wyndham, 7th Baron Leconfield, 2nd Baron Egremont
The Baron Lyveden (1859)
Colin Vernon, 8th Baron Lyveden
The Baron Brougham and Vaux (1860)
Michael Brougham, 5th Baron Brougham and Vaux
The Baron Westbury (1861)
Richard Bethell, 6th Baron Westbury
The Baron Annaly (1863)
Luke White, 6th Baron Annaly
The Baron Northbrook (1866)
Francis Baring, 6th Baron Northbrook
The Baron Hylton (1866)
Raymond Jolliffe, 5th Baron Hylton
The Baron Penrhyn (1866)
Simon Douglas-Pennant, 7th Baron Penrhyn
The Baron O'Neill (1868)
Raymond Chichester, 4th Baron O'Neill
The Baron Napier of Magdãla (1868)
Robert Napier, 6th Baron Napier of Magdãla
The Baron Rathdonnell
The Baron Lawrence (1869)
David Lawrence, 5th Baron Lawrence
The Baron Acton (1869)
John Lyon-Dalberg-Acton, 5th Baron Acton
The Baron Wolverton (1869)
Miles Glyn, 8th Baron Wolverton
The Baron O'Hagan (1870)
Charles Strachey, 4th Baron O'Hagan
The Baron Sandhurst (1871)
Guy Mansfield, 6th Baron Sandhurst
The Baron Aberdare (1873)
Alastair Bruce, 5th Baron Aberdare
The Baron Moncreiff (1874)
Rhoderick Moncreiff, 6th Baron Moncreiff
The Baron Coleridge (1874)
William Coleridge, 5th Baron Coleridge
The Baron Cottesloe (1874)
Thomas Fremantle, 6th Baron Cottesloe
The Baron Hampton (1874)
John Pakington, 7th Baron Hampton
The Baron Harlech (1876)
Jasset David Cody Ormsby-Gore, 7th Baron Harlech
The Baron Tollemache (1876)
Timothy Tollemache, 5th Baron Tollemache
The Baron Gerard (1876)
Anthony Gerard, 5th Baron Gerard
The Baron Sackville (1876)
Robert Sackville-West, 7th Baron Sackville
The Baron Norton (1878)
James Adderley, 8th Baron Norton
The Baron Trevor (1880)
Marke Hill-Trevor, 5th Baron Trevor
The Baron Ampthill (1881)
David Russell, 5th Baron Ampthill
The Baron Derwent (1881)
Robin Vanden-Bempde-Johnstone, 5th Baron Derwent
The Baron Hothfield (1881)
Anthony Tufton, 6th Baron Hothfield
The Baron Tennyson (1884)
David Harold Alexander Tennyson, 6th Baron Tennyson
The Baron Strathspey (1884)
James Grant of Grant, 6th Baron Strathspey
The Baron Monk Bretton (1884)
Christopher Mark Dodson, 4th Baron Monk Bretton
The Baron Northbourne (1884)
Charles James, 6th Baron Northbourne
The Baron Rothschild (1885)
Jacob Rothschild, 4th Baron Rothschild
The Baron Revelstoke (1885)
Alexander Rupert Baring, 7th Baron Revelstoke
The Baron Monkswell (1885)
James Collier, 6th Baron Monkswell
The Baron Ashbourne (1885)
Edward Gibson, 5th Baron Ashbourne
The Baron St Oswald (1885)
Charles Winn, 6th Baron St Oswald
The Baron Montagu of Beaulieu (1885)
Ralph Douglas-Scott-Montagu, 4th Baron Montagu of Beaulieu
The Baron Hindlip (1886)
Charles Allsopp, 6th Baron Hindlip
The Baron Grimthorpe (1886)
Edward Beckett, 5th Baron Grimthorpe
The Baron Hamilton of Dalzell (1886)
Gavin Hamilton, 5th Baron Hamilton of Dalzell
The Baron St Levan (1887)
John St Aubyn, 4th Baron St Levan
The Baron Basing (1887)
Stuart Sclater-Booth, 6th Baron Basing
The Baron de Ramsey (1887)
John Ailwyn Fellowes, 4th Baron de Ramsey
The Baron Addington (1887)
Dominic Hubbard, 6th Baron Addington
The Baron Savile (1888)
John Lumley-Savile, 4th Baron Savile
The Baron Ashcombe (1892)
Mark Cubitt, 5th Baron Ashcombe
The Baron Crawshaw (1892)
David Gerald Brooks, 5th Baron Crawshaw
The Baron Amherst of Hackney (1892)
Hugh Cecil, 5th Baron Amherst of Hackney
The Baron Newton (1892)
Richard Legh, 5th Baron Newton
The Baron Dunleath (1892)
Brian Mulholland, 6th Baron Dunleath
The Baron Swansea (1893)
Richard Vivian, 5th Baron Swansea
The Baron Aldenham and Hunsdon (1896)
 Vicary Gibbs, 6th Baron Aldenham, 4th Baron Hunsdon of Hunsdon
The Baron HolmPatrick (1897)
Hans Hamilton, 4th Baron HolmPatrick
The Baron Burton (1897)
Evan Baillie, 4th Baron Burton
The Baron Glanusk (1899)
Christopher Bailey, 5th Baron Glanusk
The Baron Cranworth (1899)
Philip Gurdon, 3rd Baron Cranworth
The Baron Avebury (1900)
Lyulph Lubbock, 5th Baron Avebury
The Baron Killanin (1900)
Red Morris, 4th Baron Killanin
The Baron Strathcona and Mount Royal (1900)
Alexander Howard, 5th Baron Strathcona and Mount Royal
The Baron Kinross (1902)
Christopher Balfour, 5th Baron Kinross
The Baron Shuttleworth (1902)
Charles Kay-Shuttleworth, 5th Baron Shuttleworth
The Baron Grenfell (1902) and Grenfell of Kilvey (life, 2000)
Julian Grenfell, 3rd Baron Grenfell, Baron Grenfell of Kilvey
The Baron Redesdale (1902) and Mitford (life, 2000)
Rupert Mitford, 6th Baron Redesdale, Baron Mitford
The Baron Burnham (1903)
Henry Lawson, 7th Baron Burnham
The Baron Biddulph (1903)
Anthony Biddulph, 5th Baron Biddulph
The Baron Ritchie of Dundee (1905)
Charles Ritchie, 6th Baron Ritchie of Dundee
The Baron Hemphill (1906)
Charles Martyn-Hemphill, 6th Baron Hemphill
The Baron Joicey (1906)
James Joicey, 5th Baron Joicey
The Baron Nunburnholme (1906)
Stephen Wilson, 6th Baron Nunburnholme
The Baron Swaythling (1907)
Charles Montagu, 5th Baron Swaythling
The Baron Blyth (1907)
James Blyth, 5th Baron Blyth
The Baron Marchamley (1908)
William Whiteley, 4th Baron Marchamley
The Baron Gorell (1909)
John Barnes, 5th Baron Gorell
The Baron Fisher (1909)
Patrick Fisher, 4th Baron Fisher of Kilverstone
The Baron Kilbracken (1909)
Christopher Godley, 4th Baron Kilbracken
The Baron Hardinge of Penshurst (1910)
Julian Hardinge, 4th Baron Hardinge of Penshurst
The Baron de Villiers (1910)
Alexander de Villiers, 4th Baron de Villiers
The Baron Glenconner (1911)
Cody Tennant, 4th Baron Glenconner
The Baron Aberconway (1911)
Henry McLaren, 4th Baron Aberconway
The Baron Merthyr (1911)
David Trevor Lewis, 5th Baron Merthyr
The Baron Rowallan (1911)
John Corbett, 4th Baron Rowallan
The Baron Ashton of Hyde (1911)
Thomas Ashton, 4th Baron Ashton of Hyde
The Baron Ravensdale (1911)
Daniel Mosley, 4th Baron Ravensdale
The Baron Hollenden (1912)
Ian Hope-Morley, 4th Baron Hollenden
The Baron Parmoor (1914)
Michael Cripps, 5th Baron Parmoor
The Baron Cunliffe (1914)
Roger Cunliffe, 3rd Baron Cunliffe
The Baron Wrenbury (1915)
William Buckley, 4th Baron Wrenbury
The Baron Faringdon (1916)
Charles Henderson, 3rd Baron Faringdon
The Baron Shaughnessy (1916)
Charles Shaughnessy, 5th Baron Shaughnessy
The Baron Rathcreedan (1916)
Christopher Norton, 3rd Baron Rathcreedan
The Baron Somerleyton (1916)
Hugh Crossley, 4th Baron Somerleyton
The Baron Carnock (1916)
Adam Nicolson, 5th Baron Carnock
The Baron Beaverbrook (1917)
Maxwell Aitken, 3rd Baron Beaverbrook
The Baron Gainford (1917)
George Pease, 4th Baron Gainford
The Baron Forteviot (1917)
John Dewar, 4th Baron Forteviot
The Baron Colwyn (1917)
Ian Hamilton-Smith, 3rd Baron Colwyn
The Baron Gisborough (1917)
Richard Chaloner, 3rd Baron Gisborough
The Baron Morris (1918)
Thomas Morris, 4th Baron Morris
The Baron Cawley (1918)
John Cawley, 4th Baron Cawley
The Baron Terrington (1918)
Christopher Woodhouse, 6th Baron Terrington
The Baron Glenarthur (1918)
Simon Arthur, 4th Baron Glenarthur
The Baron Phillimore (1918)
Francis Phillimore, 5th Baron Phillimore
The Baron Inverforth (1919)
Andrew Weir, 4th Baron Inverforth
The Baron Sinha (1919)
Arup Sinha, 6th Baron Sinha
The Baron Cochrane of Cults (1919)
Thomas Cochrane, 5th Baron Cochrane of Cults
The Baron Clwyd (1919)
John Roberts, 4th Baron Clwyd
The Baron Russell of Liverpool (1919)
Simon Russell, 3rd Baron Russell of Liverpool
The Baron Swinfen (1919)
Charles Eady, 4th Baron Swinfen
The Baron Meston (1919)
James Meston, 3rd Baron Meston
The Baron Cullen of Ashbourne (1920)
Michael Cokayne, 4th Baron Cullen of Ashbourne
The Baron Trevethin (1921) and Oaksey (1947)
Patrick Lawrence, 5th Baron Trevethin, 3rd Baron Oaksey
The Baron Glendyne (1922)
John Nivison, 4th Baron Glendyne
The Baron Manton (1922)
Miles Watson, 4th Baron Manton
The Baron Forres (1922)
Alastair Williamson, 4th Baron Forres
The Baron Vestey (1922)
William Vestey, 4th Baron Vestey
The Baron Borwick (1922)
James Borwick, 5th Baron Borwick
The Baron Maclay (1922)
Joseph Maclay, 3rd Baron Maclay
The Baron Bethell (1922)
James Bethell, 5th Baron Bethell
The Baron Darling (1924)
Robert Darling, 3rd Baron Darling
The Baron Banbury of Southam (1924)
Charles Banbury, 3rd Baron Banbury of Southam
The Baron Merrivale (1925)
Derek Duke, 4th Baron Merrivale
The Baron Bradbury (1926)
John Bradbury, 3rd Baron Bradbury
The Baron Greenway (1927)
Ambrose Greenway, 4th Baron Greenway
The Baron Hayter (1927)
William Chubb, 4th Baron Hayter
The Baron Cornwallis (1927)
Fiennes Cornwallis, 4th Baron Cornwallis
The Baron Daresbury (1927)
Peter Greenall, 4th Baron Daresbury
The Baron Wraxall (1928)
Antony Gibbs, 4th Baron Wraxall
The Baron Remnant (1928)
Philip Remnant, 4th Baron Remnant
The Baron Moynihan (1929)
Colin Moynihan, 4th Baron Moynihan
The Baron Craigmyle (1929)
Thomas Shaw, 4th Baron Craigmyle
The Baron Dulverton (1929)
Michael Hamilton Wills, 3rd Baron Dulverton
The Baron Luke (1929)
Ian Lawson Johnston, 4th Baron Luke
The Baron Alvingham (1929)
Robert Yerburgh, 3rd Baron Alvingham
The Baron Baden-Powell (1929)
Michael Baden-Powell, 4th Baron Baden-Powell
The Baron Ponsonby of Shulbrede (1930) and Ponsonby of Roehampton (life, 2000)
Frederick Ponsonby, 4th Baron Ponsonby of Shulbrede, Baron Ponsonby of Roehampton
The Baron Dickinson (1930)
Martin Dickinson, 3rd Baron Dickinson
The Baron Noel-Buxton (1930)
Charles Noel-Buxton, 4th Baron Noel-Buxton
The Baron Howard of Penrith (1930)
Philip Howard, 3rd Baron Howard of Penrith
The Baron Rochester (1931)
David Lamb, 3rd Baron Rochester
The Baron Selsdon (1932)
Malcolm Mitchell-Thomson, 3rd Baron Selsdon
The Baron Moyne (1932)
Jonathan Guinness, 3rd Baron Moyne
The Baron Davies (1932)
David Davies, 3rd Baron Davies
The Baron Rankeillour (1932)
James Hope, 6th Baron Rankeillour
The Baron Brocket (1933)
Charles Nall-Cain, 3rd Baron Brocket
The Baron Milne (1933)
George Milne, 3rd Baron Milne
The Baron Rennell (1933)
James Rodd, 4th Baron Rennell
The Baron Mottistone (1933)
Christopher Seely, 6th Baron Mottistone
The Baron Iliffe (1933)
Robert Iliffe, 3rd Baron Iliffe
The Baron Palmer (1933)
Adrian Palmer, 4th Baron Palmer
The Baron Rockley (1934)
Anthony Cecil, 4th Baron Rockley
The Baron Elton (1934)
Rodney Elton, 2nd Baron Elton
The Baron Wakehurst (1934)
Timothy Loder, 4th Baron Wakehurst
The Baron Hesketh (1935)
Alexander Fermor-Hesketh, 3rd Baron Hesketh
The Baron Tweedsmuir (1935)
John William de l'Aigle Buchan, 4th Baron Tweedsmuir
The Baron Wigram (1935)
Andrew Wigram, 3rd Baron Wigram
The Baron Riverdale (1935)
Anthony Balfour, 3rd Baron Riverdale
The Baron May (1935)
Jasper May, 4th Baron May
The Baron Kennet (1935)
William Young, 3rd Baron Kennet
The Baron Strathcarron (1936)
Ian Macpherson, 3rd Baron Strathcarron
The Baron Catto (1936)
Innes Catto, 3rd Baron Catto
The Baron Windlesham (1937)
James Hennessy, 4th Baron Windlesham
The Baron Mancroft (1937)
Benjamin Mancroft, 3rd Baron Mancroft
The Baron McGowan (1937)
Harry McGowan, 4th Baron McGowan
The Baron Denham (1937)
Richard Bowyer, 3rd Baron Denham
The Baron Rea (1937)
Matthew Rea, 4th Baron Rea
The Baron Cadman (1937)
John Cadman, 3rd Baron Cadman
The Baron Kenilworth (1937)
John Randle Siddeley, 4th Baron Kenilworth
The Baron Pender (1937)
Harry Denison-Pender, 4th Baron Pender
The Baron Roborough (1938)
Massey Lopes, 4th Baron Roborough
The Baron Brassey of Apethorpe (1938)
Edward Brassey, 4th Baron Brassey of Apethorpe
The Baron Stamp (1938)
Nicholas Charles Trevor Stamp, 5th Baron Stamp
The Baron Bicester (1938)
Charles Smith, 5th Baron Bicester
The Baron Milford (1939)
Guy Philipps, 4th Baron Milford
The Baron Hankey (1939)
Donald Hankey, 3rd Baron Hankey
The Baron Harmsworth (1939)
Thomas Harmsworth, 3rd Baron Harmsworth
The Baron Rotherwick (1939)
Robin Cayzer, 3rd Baron Rotherwick
The Baron Glentoran (1939)
Robin Dixon, 3rd Baron Glentoran
The Baron Tryon (1940)
Charles Tryon, 4th Baron Tryon
The Baron Croft (1940)
Bernard Page Croft, 3rd Baron Croft
The Baron Teviot (1940)
Charles Kerr, 2nd Baron Treviot
The Baron Nathan (1940)
Rupert Nathan, 3rd Baron Nathan
The Baron Reith (1940)
James Reith, 3rd Baron Reith
The Baron Kindersley (1941)
Rupert Kindersley, 4th Baron Kindersley
The Baron Ironside (1941)
Charles Ironside, 3rd Baron Ironside
The Baron Latham (1942)
Dominic Latham, 2nd Baron Latham
The Baron Wedgwood (1942)
Anthony John Wedgwood, 5th Baron Wedgwood
The Baron Geddes (1942)
Euan Geddes, 3rd Baron Geddes
The Baron Bruntisfield (1942)
Michael Warrender, 3rd Baron Bruntisfield
The Baron Brabazon of Tara (1942)
Ivon Moore-Brabazon, 3rd Baron Brabazon of Tara
The Baron Keyes (1943)
Charles Keyes, 3rd Baron Keyes
The Baron Hemingford (1943)
Christopher Herbert, 4th Baron Hemingford
The Baron Moran (1943)
James Wilson, 3rd Baron Moran
The Baron Killearn (1943)
Victor Lampson, 3rd Baron Killearn
The Baron Dowding (1943)
Piers Dowding, 3rd Baron Dowding
The Baron Gretton (1944)
John Gretton, 4th Baron Gretton
The Baron Westwood (1944)
Fergus Westwood, 4th Baron Westwood
The Baron Hazlerigg (1945)
Arthur Grey Hazlerigg, 3rd Baron Hazlerigg
The Baron Hacking (1945)
David Hacking, 3rd Baron Hacking
The Baron Chetwode (1945)
Philip Chetwode, 2nd Baron Chetwode
The Baron Sandford (1945)
James Edmondson, 3rd Baron Sandford
The Baron Altrincham (1945)
Sebastian Grigg, 4th Baron Altrincham
The Baron Broadbridge (1945)
Richard Broadbridge, 5th Baron Broadbridge
The Baron Mountevans (1945)
Jeffrey Evans, 4th Baron Mountevans
The Baron Lindsay of Birker (1945)
James Lindsay, 3rd Baron Lindsay of Birker
The Baron Piercy (1945)
James Piercy, 3rd Baron Piercy
The Baron Chorley (1945)
Nicholas Chorley, 3rd Baron Chorley
The Baron Calverley (1945)
Charles Muff, 3rd Baron Calverley
The Baron Tedder (1946)
Robin Tedder, 3rd Baron Tedder
The Baron Colgrain (1946)
Alastair Campbell, 4th Baron Colgrain
The Baron Darwen (1946)
Paul Davies, 4th Baron Darwen
The Baron Lucas of Chilworth (1946)
Simon Lucas, 3rd Baron Lucas of Chilworth
The Baron Shepherd (1946)
Graeme Shepherd, 3rd Baron Shepherd
The Baron Newall (1946)
Francis Newall, 2nd Baron Newall
The Baron Rugby (1947)
Robert Maffey, 3rd Baron Rugby
The Baron Layton (1947)
Jonathan Layton, 4th Baron Layton
The Baron Simon of Wythenshawe (1947)
Matilda Simon, 3rd Baroness Simon of Wythenshawe
The Baron Kershaw (1947)
Edward Kershaw, 4th Baron Kershaw
The Baron Trefgarne (1947)
David Trefgarne, 2nd Baron Trefgarne
The Baron Crook (1947)
Robert Crook, 3rd Baron Crook
The Baron Amwell (1947)
Keith Montague, 3rd Baron Amwell
The Baron Milverton (1947)
Fraser Richards, 2nd Baron Milverton
The Baron Clydesmuir (1948)
David Colville, 3rd Baron Clydesmuir
The Baron Burden (1950)
Andrew Burden, 3rd Baron Burden
The Baron Haden-Guest (1950)
Christopher Haden-Guest, 5th Baron Haden-Guest
Baron Silkin (currently disclaimed)
The Baron Hives (1950)
Matthew Hives, 3rd Baron Hives
The Baron Ogmore (1950)
Tudor Rees Rees-Williams, 4th Baron Ogmore
The Baron Morris of Kenwood (1950)
Jonathan Morris, 3rd Baron Morris of Kenwood
The Baron Macpherson of Drumochter (1951)
James Macpherson, 3rd Baron Macpherson of Drumochter
The Baron Kenswood (1951)
Michael Whitfield, 3rd Baron Kenswood
The Baron Freyberg (1951)
Valerian Freyberg, 3rd Baron Freyberg
The Baron Milner of Leeds (1951)
Richard Milner, 3rd Baron Milner of Leeds
The Baron Kirkwood (1951)
David Kirkwood, 3rd Baron Kirkwood
The Baron Wise (1951)
Christopher Wise, 3rd Baron Wise
The Baron Jeffreys (1952)
Christopher Jeffreys, 3rd Baron Jeffreys
The Baron Rathcavan (1953)
Hugh Detmar Torrens O'Neill, 3rd Baron Rathcavan
The Baron Baillieu (1953)
James Baillieu, 3rd Baron Baillieu
The Baron Grantchester (1953)
Christopher Suenson-Taylor, 3rd Baron Grantchester
The Baron Coleraine (1954)
James Law, 3rd Baron Coleraine
The Baron Harvey of Tasburgh (1954)
Charles Harvey, 3rd Baron Harvey of Tasburgh
The Baron Gridley (1955)
Richard Gridley, 3rd Baron Gridley
The Baron Strathalmond (1955)
William Fraser, 3rd Baron Strathalmond
The Baron Strathclyde (1955)
Thomas Galbraith, 2nd Baron Strathclyde
The Baron Clitheroe (1955)
Ralph John Assheton, 2nd Baron Clitheroe
The Baron McNair (1955)
Duncan McNair, 3rd Baron McNair
The Baron Colyton (1956)
Alisdair Hopkinson, 2nd Baron Colyton
The Baron Astor of Hever (1956)
John Astor, 3rd Baron Astor of Hever
The Baron Sinclair of Cleeve (1957)
John Sinclair, 3rd Baron Sinclair of Cleeve
The Baron Bridges (1957)
Mark Bridges, 3rd Baron Bridges
The Baron Norrie (1957)
George Norrie, 2nd Baron Norrie
The Baron Birkett (1958)
Thomas Birkett, 3rd Baron Birkett
The Baron Harding of Petherton (1958)
William Harding, 3rd Baron Harding of Petherton
The Baron Poole (1958)
David Poole, 2nd Baron Poole
The Baron Rootes (1959)
Nicholas Rootes, 3rd Baron Rootes
The Baron Netherthorpe (1959)
James Turner, 3rd Baron Netherthorpe
The Baron Crathorne (1959)
James Dugdale, 2nd Baron Crathorne
The Baron Spens (1959)
Patrick Spens, 4th Baron Spens
The Baron MacAndrew (1959)
Oliver Charles MacAndrew, 4th Baron MacAndrew
The Baron Nelson of Stafford (1960)
Alistair Nelson, 4th Baron Nelson of Stafford
The Baron Howick of Glendale (1960)
Charles Baring, 2nd Baron Howick of Glendale
Baron Sanderson of Ayot (currently disclaimed)
The Baron Cobbold (1960)
Henry Lytton-Cobbold, 3rd Baron Cobbold
The Baron Robertson of Oakridge (1961)
William Robertson, 3rd Baron Robertson of Oakridge
The Baron Marks of Broughton (1961)
Simon Marks, 3rd Baron Marks of Broughton
The Baron Fairhaven (1961)
Ailwyn Broughton, 3rd Baron Fairhaven
The Baron Leighton of St Mellons (1962)
Robert Seager, 3rd Baron Leighton of St Mellons
The Baron Brain (1962)
Michael Brain, 3rd Baron Brain
The Baron Aldington (1962)
Charles Low, 2nd Baron Aldington
The Baron Inchyra (1962)
James Hoyer Millar, 3rd Baron Inchyra
The Baron Silsoe (1963)
Simon Trustram Eve, 3rd Baron Silsoe
The Baron Thomson of Fleet (1964)
David Thomson, 3rd Baron Thomson of Fleet
The Baron Martonmere (1964)
John Robinson, 2nd Baron Martonmere
The Baron Sherfield (1964)
Dwight Makins, 3rd Baron Sherfield
The Baron Inglewood (1964)
Richard Fletcher-Vane, 2nd Baron Inglewood
The Baron Glendevon (1964)
Jonathan Hope, 3rd Baron Glendevon
The Baron Grimston of Westbury (1964)
Robert Grimston, 3rd Baron Grimston of Westbury
The Baron Renwick (1964)
Robert Renwick, 3rd Baron Renwick
The Baron St Helens (1964)
Richard Hughes-Young, 2nd Baron St Helens
The Baron Margadale (1965)
Alastair Morrison, 3rd Baron Margadale

Life peers

All baronies created since 1965 have either been life peerages or subsidiary baronies for peerages of higher rank, which do not appear in this list.

The Baron Tanlaw (1971) is the senior life peer
Simon Mackay, Baron Tanlaw
The Baron Kirkhill (1975)
John Smith, Baron Kirkhill
The Baron Mackay of Clashfern (1979)
James Mackay, Baron Mackay of Clashfern
The Baroness Gardner of Parkes (1981)
Trixie Gardner, Baroness Gardner of Parkes
The Baroness Cox (1983)
Caroline Cox, Baroness Cox
The Baron Cameron of Lochbroom (1984)
Kenneth Cameron, Baron Cameron of Lochbroom
The Baron Vinson (1985)
Nigel Vinson, Baron Vinson
The Baron Donoughue (1985)
Bernard Donoughue, Baron Donoughue
The Baron Sanderson of Bowden (1985)
Charles Sanderson, Baron Sanderson of Bowden
The Baroness Hooper (1985)
Gloria Hooper, Baroness Hooper
The Baron Stevens of Ludgate (1987)
David Robert Stevens, Baron Stevens of Ludgate
The Baroness Blackstone (1987)
Tessa Blackstone, Baroness Blackstone
The Baron Irvine of Lairg (1987)
Derry Irvine, Baron Irvine of Lairg
The Baroness Oppenheim-Barnes (1989)
Sally Oppenheim-Barnes, Baroness Oppenheim-Barnes
The Baron McColl of Dulwich (1989)
Ian McColl, Baron McColl of Dulwich
The Baron Clinton-Davis (1990)
Stanley Clinton Davis, Baron Clinton-Davis
The Baroness Eccles of Moulton (1990)
Diana Eccles, Viscountess Eccles, Baroness Eccles of Moulton
The Baron Cavendish of Furness (1990)
Hugh Cavendish, Baron Cavendish of Furness
The Baroness Cumberlege (1990)
Julia Cumberlege, Baroness Cumberlege
The Baroness Flather (1990)
Shreela Flather, Baroness Flather
The Baron Pearson of Rannoch (1990)
Malcolm Pearson, Baron Pearson of Rannoch
The Baroness Dunn (1990)
Lydia Dunn, Baroness Dunn
The Baron Sterling of Plaistow (1991)
Jeffrey Sterling, Baron Sterling of Plaistow
The Baron Palumbo (1991)
Peter Palumbo, Baron Palumbo
The Baron Griffiths of Fforestfach (1991)
Brian Griffiths, Baron Griffiths
The Baroness Seccombe (1991)
Joan Seccombe, Baroness Seccombe
The Baron Desai (1991)
Meghand Desai, Baron Desai
The Baroness Hamwee (1991)
Sally Hamwee, Baroness Hamwee
The Baron Marlesford (1991)
Mark Schreiber, Baron Marlesford
The Baroness Hilton of Eggardon (1991)
Jennifer Hilton, Baroness Hilton of Eggardon
The Baroness Mallalieu (1991)
Anne Mallalieu, Baroness Mallalieu
The Baron Hollick (1991)
Clive Hollick, Baron Hollick
The Baron Renfrew of Kaimsthorn (1991)
Colin Renfrew, Baron Renfrew of Kaimsthorn
The Baron Skidelsky (1991)
Robert Skidelsky, Baron Skidelsky
The Baroness Perry of Southwark (1991)
Pauline Perry, Baroness Perry of Southwark
The Baron Craig of Radley (1991)
David Craig, Baron Craig of Radley
The Baron Rodgers of Quarry Bank (1992)
Bill Rodgers, Baron Rodgers of Quarry Bank
The Baron Wilson of Tillyorn (1992)
David Wilson, Baron Wilson of Tillyorn
The Baroness Chalker of Wallasey (1992)
Lynda Chalker, Baroness Chalker of Wallasey
The Baron Wakeham (1992)
John Wakeham, Baron Wakeham
The Baron Owen (1992)
David Owen, Baron Owen
The Baron Lawson of Blaby (1992)
Nigel Lawson, Baron Lawson of Blaby
The Baron Tebbit (1992)
Norman Tebbit, Baron Tebbit
The Baron Eatwell (1992)
John Eatwell, Baron Eatwell
The Baron Plant of Highfield (1992)
Raymond Plant, Baron Plant of Highfield
The Baron Archer of Weston-super-Mare (1992)
Jeffrey Archer, Baron Archer of Weston-super-Mare
The Baroness Jay of Paddington (1992)
Margaret Jay, Baroness Jay of Paddington
The Baron Elis-Thomas (1992)
Dafydd Elis-Thomas, Baron Elis-Thomas
The Baron Woolf (1992)
Harry Woolf, Baron Woolf
The Baron Lloyd of Berwick (1993)
Anthony Lloyd, Baron Lloyd of Berwick
The Baron Haskel (1993)
Simon Haskel, Baron Haskel
The Baroness Gould of Potternewton (1993)
Joyce Gould, Baroness Gould of Potternewton
The Baron Dixon-Smith (1993)
Robert Dixon-Smith, Baron Dixon-Smith
The Baron Tugendhat (1993)
Christopher Tugendhat, Baron Tugendhat
The Baron Nickson (1994)
David Nickson, Baron Nickson
The Baron Dubs (1994)
Alfred Dubs, Baron Dubs
The Baron Tope (1994)
Graham Tope, Baron Tope
The Baroness Rawlings (1994)
Patricia Rawlings, Baroness Rawlings
The Baroness Thomas of Walliswood (1994)
Susan Thomas, Baroness Thomas of Walliswood
The Baroness Hogg (1995)
Sarah Hogg, Viscountess Hailsham, The Baroness Hogg
The Baroness Smith of Gilmorehill (1995)
Elizabeth Smith, Baroness Smith of Gilmorehill
The Baron Hoffmann (1995)
Leonard Hoffmann, Baron Hoffmann
The Baron Hope of Craighead (1995)
David Hope, Lord Hope of Craighead
The Baron Blyth of Rowington (1995)
James Blyth, Baron Blyth of Rowington
The Baron Eames (1995)
Robin Eames, Baron Eames
The Baron Winston (1995)
Robert Winston, Baron Winston
The Baron Wallace of Saltaire (1995)
William Wallace, Baron Wallace of Saltaire
The Baron McNally (1995)
Tom McNally, Baron McNally
The Baroness Hayman (1996)
Hélène Hayman, Baroness Hayman
The Baron Sewel (1996)
John Sewel, Baron Sewel
The Baron Harris of Peckham (1996)
Philip Harris, Baron Harris of Peckham
The Baroness Wilcox (1996)
Judith Wilcox, Baroness Wilcox
The Baron Bowness (1996)
Peter Spencer Bowness, Baron Bowness
The Baron Taverne (1996)
Dick Taverne, Baron Taverne
The Baron Thomas of Gresford (1996)
Martin Thomas, Baron Thomas of Gresford
The Baron Currie of Marylebone (1996)
David Currie, Baron Currie of Marylebone
The Baron Saatchi (1996)
Maurice Saatchi, Baron Saatchi
The Baroness Symons of Vernham Dean (1996)
Elizabeth Symons, Baroness Symons of Vernham Dean
The Baron Taylor of Warwick (1996)
John Taylor, Baron Taylor of Warwick
The Baron Alderdice (1996)
John Alderdice, Baron Alderdice
The Baron Paul (1996)
Swraj Paul, Baron Paul
The Baroness Ramsay of Cartvale (1996)
Meta Ramsay, Baroness Ramsay of Cartvale
The Baroness Anelay of St Johns (1996)
Joyce Anelay, Baroness Anelay of St Johns
The Baroness Byford (1996)
Hazel Byford, Baroness Byford
The Baron Chadlington (1996)
Peter Gummer, Baron Chadlington
The Baron MacLaurin of Knebworth (1996)
Ian McLaurin, Baron McLaurin of Knebworth
The Baron Whitty (1996)
Larry Whitty, Baron Whitty
The Baroness Emerton (1997)
Audrey Emerton, Baroness Emerton
The Baron Lloyd-Webber (1997)
 Andrew Lloyd Webber, Baron Lloyd-Webber
The Baron Hoyle (1997)
Doug Hoyle, Baron Hoyle
The Baron Falconer of Thoroton (1997)
Charles Falconer, Baron Falconer of Thoroton
The Baron Simon of Highbury (1997)
David Simon, Baron Simon of Highbury
The Baron Hardie (1997)
Andrew Hardie, Baron Hardie
The Baron Jopling (1997)
Michael Jopling, Baron Jopling
The Baron Howell of Guildford (1997)
David Howell, Baron Howell of Guildford
The Baron Steel of Aikwood (1997)
David Steel, Baron Steel of Aikwood
The Baron Alton of Liverpool (1997)
David Alton, Baron Alton of Liverpool
The Baron Hurd of Westwell (1997)
Douglas Hurd, Baron Hurd of Westwell
The Baron Baker of Dorking (1997)
Kenneth Baker, Baron Baker of Dorking
The Baron Patten (1997)
John Patten, Baron Patten
The Baron Levene of Portsoken (1997)
Peter Levene, Baron Levene of Portsoken
The Baron Saville of Newdigate (1997)
Mark Saville, Baron Saville of Newdigate
The Baron Levy (1997)
Michael Levy, Baron Levy
The Baroness Amos (1997)
Valerie Amos, Baroness Amos
The Baron Newby (1997)
Richard Newby, Baron Newby
The Baron Renwick of Clifton (1997)
Robin Renwick, Baron Renwick of Clifton
The Baron Lang of Monkton (1997)
Ian Lang, Baron Lang of Monkton
The Baron Selkirk of Douglas (1997)
James Douglas-Hamilton, Baron Selkirk of Douglas
The Baroness Fookes (1997)
Janet Fookes, Baroness Fookes
The Baroness Ludford (1997)
Sarah Ludford, Baroness Ludford
The Baron Blackwell (1997)
Norman Blackwell, Baron Blackwell
The Baron Davies of Oldham (1997)
Bryan Davies, Baron Davies of Oldham
The Baron Sainsbury of Turville (1997)
David Sainsbury, Baron Sainsbury of Turville
The Baron Cope of Berkeley (1997)
John Cope, Baron Cope of Berkeley
The Baroness Pitkeathley (1997)
Jill Pitkeathley, Baroness Pitkeathley
The Baron Hunt of Kings Heath (1997)
Philip Hunt, Baron Hunt of Kings Heath
The Baron Hunt of Wirral (1997)
David Hunt, Baron Hunt of Wirral
The Baron Razzall (1997)
Tim Razzall, Baron Razzall
The Baron Brooke of Alverthorpe (1997)
Clive Brooke, Baron Brooke of Alverthorpe
The Baron Dholakia (1997)
Navnit Dholakia, Baron Dholakia
The Baroness Kennedy of The Shaws (1997)
Helena Kennedy, Baroness Kennedy of The Shaws
The Baron Puttnam (1997)
David Puttnam, Baron Puttnam
The Baron Higgins (1997)
Terence Higgins, Baron Higgins
The Baron Naseby (1997)
Michael Morris, Baron Naseby
The Baron Freeman (1997)
Roger Freeman, Baron Freeman
The Baron Stone of Blackheath (1997)
Andrew Stone, Baron Stone of Blackheath
The Baroness Scotland of Asthal (1997)
Patricia Scotland, Baroness Scotland of Ashtal
The Baron Bassam of Brighton (1997)
Steve Bassam, Baron Bassam of Brighton
The Baroness Nicholson of Winterbourne (1997)
Emma Nicholson, Baroness Nicholson of Winterbourne
The Baroness Young of Old Scone (1997)
Barbara Young, Baroness Young of Old Scone
The Baron Simpson of Dunkeld (1997)
George Simpson, Baron Simpson of Dunkeld
The Baron Watson of Invergowrie (1997)
Mike Watson, Baron Watson of Invergowrie
The Baron Ryder of Wensum (1997)
Richard Ryder, Baron Ryder of Wensum
The Baron Hattersley (1997)
Roy Hattersley, Baron Hattersley
The Baron Butler of Brockwell (1998)
Robin Butler, Baron Butler of Brockwell
The Baron Clement-Jones (1998)
Timothy Clement-Jones, Baron Clement-Jones
The Baron Mackenzie of Framwellgate (1998)
Brian Mackenzie, Baron Mackenzie of Framwellgate
The Baron Alli (1998)
Waheed Alli, Baron Alli
The Baroness Uddin (1998)
Pola Uddin, Baroness Uddin
The Baron Burns (1998)
Terence Burns, Baron Burns
The Baroness Goudie (1998)
Mary Goudie, Baroness Goudie
The Baron Tomlinson (1998)
John Tomlinson, Baron Tomlinson
The Baroness Buscombe (1998)
Peta Buscombe, Baroness Buscombe
The Baroness Thornton (1998)
Glenys Thornton, Baroness Thornton
The Baron Lamont of Lerwick (1998)
Norman Lamont, Baron Lamont of Lerwick
The Baroness Crawley (1998)
Christine Crawley, Baroness Crawley
The Baron Haskins (1998)
Christopher Haskins, Baron Haskins
The Baron Phillips of Sudbury (1998)
Andrew Phillips, Baron Phillips of Sudbury
The Baron Bach (1998)
William Bach, Baron Bach
The Baron Laming (1998)
Herbert Laming, Baron Laming
The Baron Evans of Watford (1998)
David Evans, Baron Evans of Watford
The Baroness Miller of Chilthorne Domer (1998)
Susan Miller, Baroness Miller of Chilthorne Domer
The Baron Clarke of Hampstead (1998)
Anthony Clarke, Baron Clarke of Hampstead
The Baron Warner (1998)
Norman Warner, Baron Warner
The Baron Brookman (1998)
David Brookman, Baron Brookman
The Baron Christopher (1998)
Tony Christopher, Baron Christopher
The Baron Hanningfield (1998)
Paul White, Baron Hanningfield
The Baron Norton of Louth (1998)
Philip Norton, Baron Norton of Louth
The Baroness Sharp of Guildford (1998)
Margaret Sharp, Baroness Sharp of Guildford
The Baron Ahmed (1998)
Nazir Ahmed, Baron Ahmed
The Baroness Richardson of Calow (1998)
Kathleen Richardson, Baroness Richardson of Calow
The Baron Bragg (1998)
Melvyn Bragg, Baron Bragg
The Baron Sawyer (1998)
Tom Sawyer, Baron Sawyer
The Baron Harris of Haringey (1998)
Toby Harris, Baron Harris of Haringey
The Baron Macdonald of Tradeston (1998)
Gus Macdonald, Baron Macdonald of Tradeston
The Baron Phillips of Worth Matravers (1999)
Nicholas Phillips, Baron Phillips of Worth Matravers
The Baroness O'Neill of Bengarve (1999)
Onora O'Neill, Baroness O'Neill of Bengarve
The Baron Patel (1999)
Narendra Patel, Baron Patel
The Baroness Warwick of Undercliffe (1999)
Diana Warwick, Baroness Warwick of Undercliffe
The Baron Fellowes (1999)
Robert Fellowes, Baron Fellowes
The Baroness Stern (1999)
Vivien Stern, Baroness Stern
The Baron Stevenson of Coddenham (1999)
Dennis Stevenson, Baron Stevenson of Coddenham
The Baron Faulkner of Worcester (1999)
Richard Faulkner, Baron Faulkner of Worcester
The Baron Forsyth of Drumlean (1999)
Michael Forsyth, Baron Forsyth of Drumlean
The Baroness Hanham (1999)
Joan Hanham, Baroness Hanham
The Baroness Prashar (1999)
Usha Prasher, Baroness Prasher
The Baron Rogan (1999)
Dennis Rogan, Baron Rogan
The Baron Elder (1999)
Murray Elder, Baron Elder
The Baron Foster of Thames Bank (1999)
Norman Foster, Baron Foster of Thames Bank
The Baron Lea of Crondall (1999)
David Lea, Baron Lea of Crondall
The Baroness Howells of St Davids (1999)
Rosalind Howells, Baroness Howells of St Davids
The Baron Rennard (1999)
Chris Rennard, Baron Rennard
The Baron Bradshaw (1999)
William Bradshaw, Baron Bradshaw
The Baron Kirkham of Old Cantley (1999)
Graham Kirkham, Baron Kirkham of Old Cantley
The Baron Watson of Richmond (1999)
Alan Watson, Baron Watson of Richmond
The Baron Grabiner (1999)
Anthony Grabiner, Baron Grabiner
The Baroness Massey of Darwen (1999)
Doreen Massey, Baroness Massey of Darwen
The Baron Carlile of Berriew (1999)
Alex Carlile, Baron Carlile of Berriew
The Baron Oxburgh (1999)
Ronald Oxburgh, Baron Oxburgh
The Baron Harrison (1999)
Lyndon Harrison, Baron Harrison
The Baron Waldegrave of North Hill (1999)
William Waldegrave, Baron Waldegrave of North Hill
The Baron Filkin (1999)
Geoffrey Filkin, Baron Filkin
The Baron Goldsmith (1999)
Peter Goldsmith, Baron Goldsmith
The Baron Lipsey (1999)
David Lipsey, Baron Lipsey
The Baroness Wilkins (1999)
Rosalie Wilkins, Baroness Wilkins
The Baroness Barker (1999)
Elizabeth Barker, Baroness Barker
The Baroness Ashton of Upholland (1999)
Catherine Ashton, Baroness Ashton of Upholland
The Baron Sharman (1999)
Colin Sharman, Baron Sharman
The Baroness McIntosh of Hudnall (1999)
Genista McIntosh, Baroness McIntosh of Hudnall
The Baron Woolmer of Leeds (1999)
Kenneth Woolmer, Baron Woolmer of Leeds
The Baroness Gale (1999)
Anita Gale, Baroness Gale
The Baron MacKenzie of Culkein (1999)
Hector Mackenzie, Baron Mackenzie of Culkein
The Baroness Whitaker (1999)
Janet Whitaker, Baroness Whitaker
The Baroness Harris of Richmond (1999)
Angela Harris, Baroness Harris of Richmond
The Baron Robertson of Port Ellen (1999)
George Robertson, Baron Robertson of Port Ellen
The Baron Birt (2000)
John Birt, Baron Birt
The Baron Powell of Bayswater (2000)
Charles Powell, Baron Powell of Bayswater
The Baroness Northover (2000)
Lindsay Northover, Baroness Northover
The Baron Oakeshott of Seagrove Bay (2000)
Matthew Oakeshott, Baron Oakeshott of Seagrove Bay
The Baroness Billingham (2000)
Angela Billingham, Baroness Billingham
The Baron Brennan (2000)
Daniel Brennan, Baron Brennan
The Baroness Cohen of Pimlico (2000)
Janet Neel Cohen, Baroness Cohen of Pimlico
The Baron Layard (2000)
Richard Layard, Baron Layard
The Baron Turnberg (2000)
Leslie Turnberg, Baron Turnberg
The Baron Hunt of Chesterton (2000)
Julian Hunt, Baron Hunt of Chesterton
The Baroness Andrews (2000)
Kay Andrews, Baroness Andrews
The Baron Mitchell (2000)
Parry Mitchell, Baron Mitchell
The Baron Parekh (2000)
Bhikhu Parekh, Baron Parekh
The Baroness Scott of Needham Market (2000)
Rosalind Scott, Baroness Scott of Needham Market
The Baroness Walmsley (2000)
Joan Walmsley, Baroness Walmsley
The Baron Coe (2000)
Sebastian Coe, Baron Coe
The Baron Jordan (2000)
William Jordan, Baron Jordan
The Baron Hodgson of Astley Abbotts (2000)
Robin Hodgson, Baron Hodgson of Astley Abbotts
The Baroness Noakes (2000)
Sheila Noakes, Baroness Noakes
The Baron Morgan (2000)
Kenneth O. Morgan, Baron Morgan
The Baron Scott of Foscote (2000)
Richard Scott, Baron Scott of Foscote
The Baron Luce (2000)
Richard Luce, Baron Luce
The Baron Ashcroft (2000)
Michael Ashcroft, Baron Ashcroft
The Baron Best (2001)
Richard Best, Baron Best
The Baron Bhatia (2001)
Amir Bhatia, Baron Bhatia
The Baron Rooker (2001)
Jeff Rooker, Baron Rooker
The Baroness Greenfield (2001)
Susan Greenfield, Baroness Greenfield
The Baron Hannay of Chiswick (2001)
David Hannay, Baron Hannay of Chiswick
The Baroness Morgan of Huyton (2001)
Sally Morgan, Baroness Morgan of Huyton
The Baroness Howarth of Breckland (2001)
Valerie Howarth, Baroness Howarth of Breckland
The Baron Ouseley (2001)
Herman Ouseley, Baron Ouseley
The Baron Condon (2001)
Paul Condon, Baron Condon
The Baron Guthrie of Craigiebank (2001)
Charles Guthrie, Baron Guthrie of Craigiebank
The Baron Browne of Madingley (2001)
John Browne, Baron Browne of Madingley
The Baroness Finlay of Llandaff (2001)
Ilora Finlay, Baroness Finlay of Llandaff
The Baron Adebowale (2001)
Victor Adebowale, Baron Adebowale
The Baron Clark of Windermere (2001)
David Clark, Baron Clark
The Baron Grocott (2001)
Bruce Grocott, Baron Grocott
The Baron Fowler (2001)
Norman Fowler, Baron Fowler
The Baron Morris of Aberavon (2001)
John Morris, Baron Morris of Aberavon
The Baron Campbell-Savours (2001)
Dale Campbell-Savours, Baron Campbell-Savours
The Baron MacGregor of Pulham Market (2001)
John MacGregor, Baron MacGregor of Pulham Market
The Baron Jones (2001)
Barry Jones, Baron Jones
The Baron King of Bridgwater (2001)
Tom King, Baron King of Bridgwater
The Baron Heseltine (2001)
Michael Heseltine, Baron Heseltine
The Baroness Golding (2001)
Llin Golding, Baroness Golding
The Baron Kilclooney (2001)
John Taylor, Baron Kilclooney
The Baron Maginnis of Drumglass (2001)
Ken Maginnis, Baron Maginnis of Drumglass
The Baron Brooke of Sutton Mandeville (2001)
Peter Brooke, Baron Brooke of Sutton Mandeville
The Baron Black of Crossharbour (2001)
Conrad Moffat Black, Baron Black of Crossharbour
The Baron Walker of Gestingthorpe (2002)
Robert Walker, Baron Walker of Gestingthorpe
The Baron Carey of Clifton (2002)
George Carey, Baron Carey of CLifton
The Baron Wilson of Dinton (2002)
Richard Thomas James Wilson, Baron Wilson of Dinton
The Baron Cullen of Whitekirk (2003)
William Douglas Cullen, Baron Cullen of Whitekirk
The Baron Triesman (2004)
David Triesman, Baron Triesman
The Baroness Hale of Richmond (2004)
Brenda Hale, Baroness Hale of Richmond
The Baron Carswell (2004)
Robert Carswell, Baron Carswell
The Baron Brown of Eaton-under-Heywood (2004)
Simon Brown, Baron Brown of Eaton-under-Heywood
The Baron Kalms (2004)
Stanley Kalms, Baron Kalms
The Baron Drayson (2004)
Paul Drayson, Baron Drayson
The Baroness Falkner of Margravine (2004)
Kishwer Falkner, Baroness Falkner of Margravine
The Baron Tunnicliffe (2004)
Denis Tunnicliffe, Baron Tunnicliffe
The Baron Howard of Rising (2004)
Greville Howard, Baron Howard of Rising
The Baron Leitch (2004)
Alexander Leitch, Baron Leitch
The Baroness Henig (2004)
Ruth Henig, Baroness Henig
The Baron Carter of Coles (2004)
Patrick Carter, Baron Carter of Coles
The Baron Snape (2004)
Peter Charles Snape, Baron Snape
The Baroness Morris of Bolton (2004)
Patricia Morris, Baroness Morris of Bolton
The Baron Truscott (2004)
Peter Truscott, Baron Truscott
The Baroness Prosser (2004)
Margaret Prosser, Baroness Prosser
The Baroness Morgan of Drefelin (2004)
Delyth Morgan, Baroness Morgan
The Baron Laidlaw (2004)
Irvine Laidlaw, Baron Laidlaw
The Baron Rosser (2004)
Richard Rosser, Baron Rosser
The Baroness Neuberger (2004)
Julia Babette Sarah Neuberger, Baroness Neuberger
The Baron Roberts of Llandudno (2004)
Roger Roberts, Baron Roberts
The Baron Giddens (2004)
Anthony Giddens
The Baron Rana (2004)
Diljit Rana, Baron Rana
The Baroness Murphy (2004)
Elaine Murphy, Baroness Murphy
The Baron Maxton (2004)
John Alston Maxton, Baron Maxton
The Baron Dykes (2004)
Hugh Dykes, Baron Dykes
The Baron Broers (2004)
Alec Broers, Baron Broers
The Baroness Young of Hornsey (2004)
Lola Young, Baroness Young of Hornsey
The Baron Vallance of Tummel (2004)
Iain Vallance, Baron Vallance of Tummel
The Baroness Bonham-Carter of Yarnbury (2004)
Jane Bonham Carter, Baroness Bonham-Carter of Yarnbury
The Baroness McDonagh (2004)
Margaret McDonagh, Baroness McDonagh
The Baron Young of Norwood Green (2004)
Anthony Young, Baron Young of Norwood Green
The Baroness Royall of Blaisdon (2004)
Janet Royall, Baroness Royall of Blaisdon
The Baron Rowlands (2004)
Edward Rolands, Baron Rowlands
The Baron Haworth (2004)
Alan Haworth, Baron Haworth
The Baron Cameron of Dillington (2004)
Ewen Cameron, Baron Cameron of Dillington
The Baron Griffiths of Burry Port (2004)
Leslie Griffiths, Baron Griffiths of Burry Port
The Baron Kerr of Kinlochard (2004)
John Kerr, Baron Kerr of Kinlochard
The Baroness D'Souza (2004)
Frances D'Souza, Baroness D'Souza
The Baron Alliance (2004)
David Alliance, Baron Alliance
The Baron Patten of Barnes (2005)
Chris Patten, Baron Patten of Barnes
The Baron Kinnock (2005)
Neil Kinnock, Baron Kinnock
The Baron Hope of Thornes (2005)
David Hope, Baron Hope of Thornes
The Baron Stevens of Kirkwhelpington (2005)
John Stevens, Baron Stevens of Kirkwhelpington
The Baron Adonis (2005)
Andrew Adonis, Baron Adonis
The Baroness Fritchie (2005)
Rennie Fritchie, Baroness Fritchie
The Baron Kirkwood of Kirkhope (2005)
Archy Kirkwood, Baron Kirkwood of Kirkhope
The Baroness Taylor of Bolton (2005)
Ann Taylor, Baroness Taylor of Bolton
The Baroness Morris of Yardley (2005)
Estelle Morris, Baron Morris of Yardley
The Baron Howarth of Newport (2005)
Alan Howarth, Baron Howarth of Newport
The Baron Tyler (2005)
Paul Tyler, Baron Tyler
The Baron Foulkes of Cumnock (2005)
George Foulkes, Baron Foulkes of Cumnock
The Baron Hamilton of Epsom (2005)
Archie Hamilton, Baron Hamilton of Epsom
The Baroness Shephard of Northwold (2005)
Gillian Shephard, Baroness Shephard of Northwold
The Baroness Clark of Calton (2005)
Lynda Clark, Baroness Clark of Calton
The Baron Moonie (2005)
Lewis Moonie, Baron Moonie
The Baron Smith of Finsbury (2005)
Chris Smith, Baron Smith of Finsbury
The Baroness Tonge (2005)
Jenny Tonge, Baroness Tonge
The Baroness Bottomley of Nettlestone (2005)
Virginia Bottomley, Baroness Bottomley of Nettlestone
The Baron Cunningham of Felling (2005)
Jack Cunningham, Baron Cunningham of Felling
The Baron Anderson of Swansea (2005)
Donald Anderson, Baron Anderson of Swansea
The Baroness Adams of Craigielea (2005)
Irene Adams, Baroness Adams of Craigielea
The Baron Soley (2005)
Clive Soley, Baron Soley
The Baroness Corston (2005)
Jean Corston, Baroness Corston
The Baron Goodlad (2005)
Alastair Goodlad, Baron Goodlad
The Baron Rees of Ludlow (2005)
Martin Rees, Baron Rees of Ludlow
The Baron Turner of Ecchinswell (2005)
Adair Turner, Baron Turner of Ecchinswell
The Baron Mance (2005)
Jonathan Hugh Mance, Baron Mance
The Baroness Deech (2005)
Ruth Deech, Baroness Deech
The Baroness Valentine (2005)
Jo Valentine, Baroness Valentine
The Baron Turnbull (2005)
Andrew Turnbull, Baron Turnbull
The Baron Hastings of Scarisbrick (2005)
Michael Hastings, Baron Hastings of Scarisbrick
The Baron Davidson of Glen Clova (2006)
Neil Davidson, Baron Davidson of Glen Clova
The Baron Crisp (2006)
Nigel Crisp, Baron Crisp
The Baron Lee of Trafford (2006)
John Lee, Baron Lee of Trafford
The Baroness Thomas of Winchester (2006)
Celia Thomas, Baroness Thomas of Winchester
The Baron Cotter (2006)
Brian Cotter, Baron Cotter
The Baroness Quin (2006)
Joyce Quin, Baroness Quin
The Baron Taylor of Holbeach (2006)
John Taylor, Baron Taylor of Holbeach
The Baron Burnett (2006)
John Burnett, Baron Burnett
The Baroness Kingsmill (2006)
Denise Kingsmill, Baroness Kingsmill
The Baron Teverson (2006)
Robin Teverson, Baron Teverson
The Baroness Verma (2006)
Sandip Verma, Baroness Verma
The Baroness Jones of Whitchurch (2006)
Maggie Jones, Baroness Jones of Whitchurch
The Baroness Ford (2006)
Margaret Ford, Baroness Ford
The Baron Morrow (2006)
Maurice Morrow, Baron Morrow
The Baron Morris of Handsworth (2006)
Bill Morris, Baron Morris of Handsworth
The Baron Marland (2006)
Jonathan Marland, Baron Marland
The Baron Patel of Bradford (2006)
Kamlesh Patel, Baron Patel of Bradford
The Baron James of Blackheath (2006)
David James, Baron James of Blackheath
The Baron Bradley (2006)
Keith Bradley, Baron Bradley
The Baron Browne of Belmont (2006)
Wallace Browne, Baron Browne of Belmont
The Baroness Butler-Sloss (2006)
Elizabeth Butler-Sloss, Baroness Butler-Sloss
The Baron Low of Dalston (2006)
Colin Low, Baron Low of Dalston
The Baroness Paisley of St. George's (2006)
Eileen Paisley, Baroness Paisley of St George's
The Baron Boyd of Duncansby (2006)
Colin Boyd, Baron Boyd of Duncansby
The Baron Rowe-Beddoe (2006)
David Rowe-Beddoe, Baron Rowe-Beddoe
The Baron Dear (2006)
Geoffrey Dear, Baron Dear
The Baron Bilimoria (2006)
Karan Bilimoria, Baron Bilimoria
The Baroness Meacher (2006)
Molly Meacher, Baroness Meacher
The Baron Harries of Pentregarth (2006)
Richard Harries, Baron Harries of Pentregarth
The Baron Jay of Ewelme (2006)
Michael Jay, Baron Jay of Ewelme
The Baron Walker of Aldringham (2006)
Michael Walker, Baron Walker of Aldringham
The Baron Neuberger of Abbotsbury (2007)
David Neuberger, Baron Neuberger of Abbotsbury
The Baroness Coussins (2007)
Jean Coussins, Baroness Coussins
The Baron Bew (2007)
Paul Bew, Baron Bew
The Baron Hameed (2007)
Khalid Hameed, Baron Hameed
The Baron Krebs (2007)
John Krebs, Baron Krebs
The Baron Mawson (2007)
Andrew Mawson, Baron Mawson
The Baroness Campbell of Surbiton (2007)
Jane Campbell, Baroness Campbell of Surbiton
The Baron Malloch-Brown (2007)
Mark Malloch Brown, Baron Malloch-Brown
The Baron West of Spithead (2007)
Alan West, Baron West of Spithead
The Baron Jones of Birmingham (2007)
Digby Jones, Baron Jones of Birmingham
The Baroness Vadera (2007)
Shriti Vadera, Baroness Vadera
The Baron Darzi of Denham (2007)
Ara Darzi, Baron Darzi of Denham
The Baron Janvrin (2007)
Robin Janvrin, Baron Janvrin
The Baroness Warsi (2007)
Sayeeda Warsi, Baroness Warsi
The Baroness Neville-Jones (2007)
Pauline Neville-Jones, Baroness Neville-Jones
The Baroness Garden of Frognal (2007)
Susan Garden, Baroness Garden of Frognal
The Baron Wallace of Tankerness (2007)
Jim Wallace, Baron Wallace of Tankerness
The Baron Stern of Brentford (2007)
Nicholas Stern, Baron Stern of Brentford
The Baron Mogg (2008)
John Frederick Mogg, Baron Mogg
The Baron Smith of Kelvin (2008)
Robert Smith, Baron Smith of Kelvin
The Baroness Manningham-Buller (2008)
Eliza Manningham-Buller, Baroness Manningham-Buller
The Baron Bates (2008)
Michael Bates, Baron Bates
The Baron Judge (2008)
Igor Judge, Baron Judge
The Baron Mandelson (2008)
Peter Mandelson, Baron Mandelson
The Baron Carter of Barnes (2008)
Stephen A. Carter, Baron Carter of Barnes
The Baron Pannick (2008)
David Pannick, Baron Pannick
The Baroness Campbell of Loughborough (2008)
Sue Campbell, Baroness Campbell of Loughborough
The Baron Davies of Abersoch (2009)
Mervyn Davies, Baron Davies of Abersoch
The Baron Collins of Mapesbury (2009)
Lawrence Collins, Baron Collins of Mapesbury
The Baron Clarke of Stone-cum-Ebony (2009)
Anthony Clarke, Baron Clarke of Stone-cum-Ebony
The Baron Freud (2009)
David Freud, Baron Freud
The Baroness Kinnock of Holyhead (2009)
Glenys Kinnock, Baroness Kinnock of Holyhead
The Baron Sugar (2009)
Alan Sugar, Baron Sugar
The Baroness O'Loan (2009)
Nuala O'Loan, Baroness O'Loan
The Baron Hall of Birkenhead (2010)
Tony Hall, Baron Hall of Birkenhead
The Baron Kakkar (2010)
Ajay Kakkar, Baron Kakkar
The Baroness Grey-Thompson (2010)
Tanni Grey-Thompson, Baroness Grey-Thompson
The Baron Bichard (2010)
Michael Bichard, Baron Bichard
The Baron Hill of Oareford (2010)
Jonathan Hill, Baron Hill of Oareford
The Baron Wei (2010)
Nat Wei, Baron Wei
The Baron Sassoon (2010)
James Sassoon, Baron Sassoon
The Baroness Sherlock (2010)
Maeve Sherlock, Baroness Sherlock
The Baron McFall of Alcluith (2010)
John McFall, Baron McFall of Alcluith
The Baron Wolfson of Aspley Guise (2010)
Simon Wolfson, Baron Wolfson of Aspley Guise
The Baron Willis of Knaresborough (2010)
Phil Willis, Baron Willis of Knaresborough
The Baroness Armstrong of Hill Top (2010)
Hilary Armstrong, Baroness Armstrong of Hill Top
The Baron Liddle (2010)
Roger Liddle, Baron Liddle
The Baroness Drake (2010)
Jeannie Drake, Baroness Drake
The Baroness Wheeler (2010)
Margaret Wheeler, Baroness Wheeler
The Baron Deben (2010)
John Gummer, Baron Deben
The Baron Kennedy of Southwark (2010)
Roy Kennedy, Baron Kennedy of Southwark
The Baroness Hayter of Kentish Town (2010)
Dianne Hayter, Baroness Hayter of Kentish Town
The Baron McAvoy (2010)
Tommy McAvoy, Baron McAvoy
The Baron Knight of Weymouth (2010)
Jim Knight, Baron Knight of Weymouth
The Baron Gardiner of Kimble (2010)
John Gardiner, Baron Gardiner of Kimble
The Baron German (2010)
Mike German, Baron German
The Baroness Hussein-Ece (2010)
Meral Hussein-Ece, Baroness Hussein-Ece
The Baroness Benjamin (2010)
Floella Benjamin, Baroness Benjamin
The Baroness Donaghy (2010)
Rita Donaghy, Baroness Donaghy
The Baron Hutton of Furness (2010)
John Hutton, Baron Hutton of Furness
The Baron Boateng (2010)
Paul Boateng, Baron Boateng
The Baron McConnell of Glenscorrodale (2010)
Jack McConnell, Baron McConell of Glenscorrodale
The Baron Touhig (2010)
Don Touhig, Baron Touhig
The Baron Davies of Stamford (2010)
Quentin Davies, Baron Davies of Stamford
The Baroness Smith of Basildon (2010)
Angela Smith, Baroness Smith of Basildon
The Baron Prescott (2010)
John Prescott, Baron Prescott
The Baroness Liddell of Coatdyke (2010)
Helen Liddell, Baroness Liddell of Coatdyke
The Baron Boswell of Aynho (2010)
Tim Boswell, Baron Boswell of Aynho
The Baron Black of Brentwood (2010)
Guy Black, Baron Black of Brentwood
The Baroness Browning (2010)
Angela Browning, Baroness Browning
The Baron Wills (2010)
Michael Wills, Baron Wills
The Baron Popat (2010)
Dolar Amarshi Popat, Baron Popat
The Baroness Stedman-Scott (2010)
Deborah Stedman-Scott, Baroness Stedman-Scott
The Baron Macdonald of River Glaven (2010)
Ken Macdonald, Baron Macdonald of River Glaven
The Baron Stevenson of Balmacara (2010)
Wilfrid Stevenson, Baron Stevenson
The Baron Howard of Lympne (2010)
Michael Howard, Baron Howard of Lympne
The Baron Shipley (2010)
John Shipley, Baron Shipley
The Baroness Newlove (2010)
Helen Newlove, Baroness Newlove
The Baroness Parminter (2010)
Kathryn Parminter, Baroness Parminter
The Baroness Hughes of Stretford (2010)
Beverley Hughes, Baroness Hughes of Stretford
The Baron Taylor of Goss Moor (2010)
Matthew Taylor, Baron Taylor of Goss Moor
The Baron Reid of Cardowan (2010)
John Reid, Baron Reid of Cardowan
The Baroness Nye (2010)
Sue Nye, Baroness Nye
The Baroness Healy of Primrose Hill (2010)
Anna Healy, Baroness Healy of Primrose Hill
The Baron Blair of Boughton (2010)
Ian Blair, Baron Blair of Boughton
The Baron Beecham (2010)
Jeremy Beecham, Baron Beecham
The Baron Faulks (2010)
Edward Faulks, Baron Faulks
The Baroness Eaton (2010)
Ellen Margaret Eaton, Baroness Eaton
The Baron Allan of Hallam (2010)
Richard Allan, Baron Allan of Hallam
The Baron Browne of Ladyton (2010)
Des Browne, Baron Browne of Ladyton
The Baron Monks (2010)
John Monks, Baron Monks
The Baron Hennessy of Nympsfield (2010)
Peter Hennessy, Baron Hennessy of Nympsfield
The Baroness Hollins (2010)
Sheila Hollins, Baroness Hollins
The Baron Green of Hurstpierpoint (2010)
Stephen Green, Baron Green of Hurstpierpoint
The Baron Lingfield (2010)
Robert Balchin, Baron Lingfield
The Baron Feldman of Elstree (2010)
Andrew Feldman, Baron Feldman of Elstree
The Baron Dobbs (2010)
Michael Dobbs, Baron Dobbs
The Baron Cormack (2010)
Patrick Cormack, Baron Cormack
The Baron Sharkey (2010)
John Sharkey, Baron Sharkey
The Baron Ribeiro (2010)
Bernard Ribeiro, Baron Ribeiro
The Baroness Shackleton of Belgravia (2010)
Fiona Shackleton, Baroness Shackleton of Belgravia
The Baroness Doocey (2010)
Dee Doocey, Baroness Doocey
The Baroness Kramer (2010)
Susan Kramer, Baroness Kramer
The Baroness Wheatcroft (2010)
Patience Wheatcroft, Baroness Wheatcroft
The Baron True (2010)
Nicholas True, Baron True
The Baron Lexden (2010)
Alistair Cooke, Baron Lexden
The Baroness Jolly (2010)
Judith Jolly, Baroness Jolly
The Baron Risby (2010)
Richard Spring, Baron Risby
The Baroness Stowell of Beeston (2011)
Tina Stowell, Baroness Stowell of Beeston
The Baron Strasburger (2011)
Paul Strasburger, Baron Strasburger
The Baron Marks of Henley-on-Thames (2011)
Jonathan Marks, Baron Marks of Henley-on-Thames
The Baron Wasserman (2011)
Gordon Joshua Wasserman, Baron Wasserman
The Baron Fellowes of West Stafford (2011)
Julian Fellowes, Baron Fellowes of West Stafford
The Baron Loomba (2011)
Rajinder Paul Loomba, Baron Loomba
The Baron Ahmad of Wimbledon (2011)
Tariq Ahmad, Baron Ahmad of Wimbledon
The Baron Flight (2011)
Howard Flight, Baron Flight
The Baron Edmiston (2011)
Robert Edmiston, Baron Edmiston
The Baron Framlingham (2011)
Michael Lord, Baron Framlingham
The Baron Wood of Anfield (2011)
Stewart Wood, Baron Wood of Anfield
The Baron Empey (2011)
Reg Empey, Baron Empey
The Baron Palmer of Childs Hill (2011)
Monroe Palmer, Baron Palmer of Childs Hill
The Baron Stoneham of Droxford (2011)
Ben Stoneham, Baron Stoneham of Droxford
The Baron Fink (2011)
Stanley Fink, Baron Fink
The Baroness Berridge (2011)
Elizabeth Berridge, Baroness Berridge
The Baron Dannatt (2011)
Richard Dannatt, Baron Dannatt
The Baron Wigley (2011)
Dafydd Wigley, Baron Wigley
The Baron Collins of Highbury (2011)
Ray Collins, Baron Collins of Highbury
The Baron Hussain (2011)
Qurban Hussain, Baron Hussain
The Baroness Bakewell (2011)
Joan Bakewell, Baroness Bakewell
The Baron Kestenbaum (2011)
Jonathan Kestenbaum, Baron Kestenbaum
The Baroness Morgan of Ely (2011)
Eluned Morgan, Baroness Morgan of Ely
The Baron Magan of Castletown (2011)
George Magan, Baron Magan of Castletown
The Baron Grade of Yarmouth (2011)
Michael Grade, Baron Grade of Yarmouth
The Baroness Jenkin of Kennington (2011)
Anne Jenkin, Baroness Jenkin of Kennington
The Baroness King of Bow (2011)
Oona King, Baroness King of Bow
The Baroness Randerson (2011)
Jenny Randerson, Baroness Randerson
The Baroness Tyler of Enfield (2011)	
Claire Tyler, Baroness Tyler of Enfield
The Baron Stirrup (2011)
Graham Stirrup, Baron Stirrup
The Baroness Lister of Burtersett (2011) 	
Ruth Lister, Baroness Lister of Burtersett
The Baroness Worthington (2011)
Bryony Worthington, Baroness Worthington
The Baron Gold (2011)
David Gold, Baron Gold
The Baron Glendonbrook (2011)
Michael Bishop, Baron Glendonbrook
The Baron Storey (2011)
Mike Storey, Baron Storey
The Baron Stephen (2011)
Nicol Stephen, Baron Stephen
The Baron Glasman (2011)
Maurice Glasman, Baron Glasman
The Baroness Brinton (2011)
Sal Brinton, Baroness Brinton
The Baron Blencathra (2011)
David Maclean, Baron Blencathra
The Baron Singh of Wimbledon (2011)
Indarjit Singh, Baron Singh of Wimbledon
The Baron Curry of Kirkharle (2011)
Donald Curry, Baron Curry of Kirkharle
The Baron O'Donnell (2012)
Gus O'Donnell, Baron O'Donnell
The Baroness Kidron (2012)
Beeban Kidron, Baronness Kidron
The Baron Trees (2012)
Alexander Trees, Baron Trees
The Baron Deighton (2012)
Paul Deighton, Baron Deighton
The Baron Williams of Oystermouth (2013)
Rowan Williams, Baron Williams of Oystermouth
The Baron Nash (2013)
John Nash, Baron Nash
The Baroness Lane-Fox of Soho (2013)
Martha Lane Fox, Baroness Lane-Fox of Soho
The Baron Berkeley of Knighton (2013)
Michael Berkeley, Baron Berkeley of Knighton
The Baron Livingston of Parkhead (2013)
Ian Livingston, Baron Livingston of Parkhead
The Baron King of Lothbury (2013)
Mervyn King, Baron King of Lothbury
The Baron Horam (2013)
John Horam, Baron Horam
The Baroness Grender (2013)
Rosalind Grender, Baroness Grender
The Baron Wrigglesworth (2013)
Ian Wrigglesworth, Baron Wrigglesworth
The Baron Mendelsohn (2013)
Jonathan Mendelsohn, Baron Mendelsohn
The Baroness Manzoor (2013)
Zahida Manzoor, Baroness Manzoor
The Baroness Lawrence of Clarendon (2013)
Doreen Lawrence, Baroness Lawrence of Clarendon
The Baron Bourne of Aberystwyth (2013)
Nicholas Bourne, Baron Bourne of Aberystwyth
The Baroness Bakewell of Hardington Mandeville (2013)
Catherine Bakewell, Baroness Bakewell of Hardington Mandeville
The Baron Whitby (2013)
Michael Whitby, Baron Whitby
The Baroness Neville-Rolfe (2013)
Lucy Neville-Rolfe, Baroness Neville-Rolfe
The Baron Finkelstein (2013)
Daniel Finkelstein, Baron Finkelstein
The Baron Carrington of Fulham (2013)
Matthew Carrington, Baron Carrington of Fulham
The Baron Sherbourne of Didsbury (2013)
Stephen Sherbourne, Baron Sherbourne of Didsbury
The Baron Paddick (2013)
Brian Paddick, Baron Paddick
The Baron Purvis of Tweed (2013)
Jeremy Purvis, Baron Purvis of Tweed
The Baron Leigh of Hurley (2013)
Howard Leigh, Baron Leigh of Hurley
The Baroness Hodgson of Abinger (2013)
Fiona Hodgson, Baroness Hodgson of Abinger
The Baron Verjee (2013)
Rumi Verjee, Baron Verjee
The Baroness Suttie (2013)
Alison Suttie, Baroness Suttie
The Baroness Humphreys (2013)
Christine Humphreys, Baroness Humphreys
The Baron Haughey (2013)
William Haughey, Baron Haughey
The Baroness Kennedy of Cradley (2013)
Alicia Kennedy, Baroness Kennedy of Cradley
The Baron Balfe (2013)
Richard Balfe, Baron Balfe
The Baroness Williams of Trafford (2013)
Susan Williams, Baroness Williams of Trafford
The Baroness Jones of Moulescoomb (2013)
Jenny Jones, Baroness Jones of Moulescoomb
The Baron Palumbo of Southwark (2013)
James Palumbo, Baron Palumbo of Southwark
The Baron Allen of Kensington (2013)
Charles Allen, Baron Allen of Kensington
The Baroness Goldie (2013)
Annabel Goldie, Baroness Goldie
The Baron Bamford (2013)
Anthony Bamford, Baron Bamford
The Baron Thomas of Cwmgiedd (2013)
John Thomas, Baron Thomas of Cwmgiedd
The Baron Richards of Herstmonceux (2014)
David Richards, Baron Richards of Herstmonceux
The Baron Farmer (2014)
Michael Farmer, Baron Farmer
The Baron Fox (2014)
Chris Fox, Baron Fox
The Baron Suri (2014)
Ranbir Singh Suri, Baron Suri
The Baroness Smith of Newnham (2014)
Julie Smith, Baroness Smith of Newnham
The Baroness Evans of Bowes Park (2014)
Natalie Evans, Baroness Evans of Bowes Park
The Baron Goddard of Stockport (2014)
David Goddard, Baron Goddard of Stockport
The Baroness Harding of Winscombe (2014)
Diana Harding, Baroness Harding of Winscombe
The Baroness Chisholm of Owlpen (2014)
Caroline Chisholm, Baroness Chisholm of Owlpen
The Baroness Shields (2014)
Joanna Shields, Baroness Shields
The Baron Rose of Monewden (2014)
Stuart Rose, Baron Rose of Monewden
The Baron Cooper of Windrush (2014)
Andrew Cooper, Baron Cooper of Windrush
The Baron Helic (2014)
Arminka Helic, Baron Helic
The Baroness Rebuck (2014)
Gail Rebuck, Baroness Rebuck
The Baroness Mobarik (2014)
Nosheena Mobarik, Baroness Mobarik
The Baron Scriven (2014)
Paul Scriven, Baron Scriven
The Baron Lennie (2014)
Christopher Lennie, Baron Lennie
The Baroness Brady (2014)
Karren Brady, Baroness Brady
The Baron Cashman (2014)
Michael Cashman, Baron Cashman
The Baroness Pinnock (2014)
Kathryn Pinnock, Baroness Pinnock
The Baron Callanan (2014)
Martin Callanan, Baron Callanan
The Baroness Janke (2014)
Barbara Janke, Baroness Janke
The Baron Green of Deddington (2014)
Andrew Green, Baron Green of Deddington
The Baroness Wolf of Dulwich (2014)
Alison Wolf, Baroness Wolf of Dulwich
The Baron Evans of Weardale (2014)
Jonathan Evans, Baron Evans of Weardale
The Baron Lisvane (2014)
Robert Rogers, Baron Lisvane
The Baron Hay of Ballyore (2014)
William Hay, Baron Hay of Ballyore
The Baron Kerslake (2015)
Robert Kerslake, Baron Kerslake
The Baroness Altmann (2015)
Rosalind Altmann, Baroness Altmann
The Baron Dunlop (2015)
Andrew Dunlop, Baron Dunlop
The Baron Maude of Horsham (2015)
Francis Maude, Baron Maude of Horsham
The Baron O'Neill of Gatley (2015)
James O'Neill, Baron O'Neill of Gatley
The Baron Bridges of Headley (2015)
George Bridges, Baron Bridges of Headley
The Baron Prior of Brampton (2015)
David Prior, Baron Prior of Brampton
The Baron Keen of Elie (2015)
Richard Keen, Baron Keen of Elie
The Baron Blunkett (2015)
David Blunkett, Baron Blunkett
The Baron Hayward (2015)
Robert Hayward, Baron Hayward
The Baron Young of Cookham (2015)
George Young, Baron Young of Cookham
The Baron Smith of Hindhead (2015)
Philip Smith, Baron Smith of Hindhead
The Baron Gilbert of Panteg (2015)
Stephen Gilbert, Baron Gilbert of Panteg
The Baroness Mone (2015)
Michelle Mone, Baroness Mone
The Baron Arbuthnot of Edrom (2015)
James Arbuthnot, Baron Arbuthnot of Edrom
The Baron O'Shaughnessy (2015)
James O'Shaughnessy, Baron O'Shaughnessy
The Baroness Stroud (2015)
Philippa Stroud, Baroness Stroud
The Baron Polak (2015)
Stuart Polak, Baron Polak
The Baroness Sheehan (2015)
Shas Sheehan, Baroness Sheehan
The Baron Lansley (2015)
Andrew Lansley, Baron Lansley
The Baron Oates (2015)
Jonny Oates, Baron Oates
The Baron Lupton (2015)
James Lupton, Baron Lupton
The Baroness McIntosh of Pickering (2015)
Anne McIntosh, Baroness McIntosh of Pickering
The Baroness Redfern (2015)
Liz Redfern, Baroness Redfern
The Baron Foster of Bath (2015)
Don Foster, Baron Foster of Bath
The Baroness Pidding (2015)
Emma Pidding, Baroness Pidding
The Baroness Scott of Bybrook (2015)
Jane Scott, Baroness Scott of Bybrook
The Baron Hague of Richmond (2015)
William Hague, Baron Hague of Richmond
The Baroness Burt of Solihull (2015)
Lorely Burt, Baroness Burt of Solihull
The Baron Barker of Battle (2015)
Gregory Barker, Baron Barker of Battle
The Baron Robathan (2015)
Andrew Robathan, Baron Robathan
The Baron Campbell of Pittenweem (2015)
Menzies Campbell, Baron Campbell of Pittenweem
The Baron Shinkwin (2015)
Kevin Shinkwin, Baron Shinkwin
The Baroness Finn (2015)
Simone Finn, Baroness Finn
The Baroness Rock (2015)
Kate Rock, Baroness Rock
The Baron Porter of Spalding (2015)
Gary Porter, Baron Porter of Spalding
The Baroness McGregor-Smith (2015)
Ruby McGregor-Smith, Baroness McGregor-Smith
The Baron Willetts (2015)
David Willetts, Baron Willetts
The Baron Bruce of Bennachie (2015)
Malcolm Bruce, Baron Bruce of Bennachie
The Baron Beith (2015)
Alan Beith, Baron Beith
The Baron Murphy of Torfaen (2015)
Paul Murphy, Baron Murphy of Torfaen
The Baroness Featherstone (2015)
Lynne Featherstone, Baroness Featherstone
The Baroness Thornhill (2015)
Dorothy Thornhill, Baroness Thornhill
The Baron Livermore (2015)
Spencer Livermore, Baron Livermore
The Baron Hain (2015)
Peter Hain, Baron Hain
The Baroness Fall (2015)
Catherine Fall, Baroness Fall
The Baroness Bowles of Berkhamsted (2015)
Sharon Bowles, Baroness Bowles of Berkhamsted
The Baron Watts (2015)
David Watts, Baron Watts
The Baron Stunell (2015)
Andrew Stunell, Baron Stunell
The Baroness Primarolo (2015)
Dawn Primarolo, Baroness Primarolo
The Baron Mair (2015)
Robert Mair, Baron Mair
The Baron Bird (2015)
John Bird, Baron Bird
The Baroness Brown of Cambridge (2015)
Julia King, Baroness Brown of Cambridge
The Baroness Watkins of Tavistock (2015)
Mary Watkins, Baroness Watkins of Tavistock
The Baron Darling of Roulanish (2015)
Alistair Darling, Baron Darling of Roulanish
The Baron Price (2016)
Mark Price, Baron Price
The Baroness Sugg (2016)
Liz Sugg, Baroness Sugg
The Baroness Vere of Norbiton (2016)
Charlotte Vere, Baroness Vere of Norbiton
The Baron Gadhia (2016)
Jitesh Gadhia, Baron Gadhia
The Baron McInnes of Kilwinning (2016)
Mark McInnes, Baron McInnes of Kilwinning
The Baron Kirkhope of Harrogate (2016)
Timothy Kirkhope, Baron Kirkhope of Harrogate
The Baron Caine (2016)
Jonathan Caine, Baron Caine
The Baroness Bertin (2016)
Gabrielle Bertin, Baroness Bertin
The Baroness Bloomfield of Hinton Waldrish (2016)
Olivia Bloomfield, Baroness Bloomfield of Hinton Waldrish
The Baroness Chakrabarti (2016)
Shami Chakrabarti, Baroness Chakrabarti
The Baroness Cavendish of Little Venice (2016)
Camilla Cavendish, Baroness Cavendish of Little Venice
The Baron Macpherson of Earl's Court (2016)
Nicholas Macpherson, Baron Macpherson of Earl's Court
The Baron Ricketts (2016)
Peter Ricketts, Baron Ricketts
The Baron Llewellyn of Steep (2016)
Edward Llewellyn, Baron Llewellyn of Steep
The Baroness Wyld (2017)
Laura Wyld, Baroness Wyld
The Baron Duncan of Springbank (2017)
Ian Duncan, Baron Duncan of Springbank
The Baroness Fairhead (2017)
Rona Fairhead, Baroness Fairhead
The Baron Agnew of Oulton (2017)
Theodore Agnew, Baron Agnew of Oulton
The Baron Burnett of Maldon (2017)
Ian Burnett, Baron Burnett of Maldon
The Baron Geidt (2017)
Christopher Geidt, Baron Geidt
The Baron Chartres (2017)
Richard Chartres, Baron Chartres
The Baron Hogan-Howe (2017)
Bernard Hogan-Howe, Baron Hogan-Howe
The Baron Houghton of Richmond (2017)
Nick Houghton, Baron Houghton of Richmond
The Baron Tyrie (2018)
Andrew Tyrie, Baron Tyrie
The Baron Pickles (2018)
Eric Pickles, Baron Pickles
The Baron Lilley (2018)
Peter Lilley, Baron Lilley
The Baron McCrea of Magherafelt and Cookstown (2018)
William McCrea, Baron McCrea of Magherafelt and Cookstown
The Baroness Meyer (2018)
Catherine Meyer, Baroness Meyer
The Baroness Sater (2018)
Amanda Sater, Baroness Sater
The Baroness Bryan of Partick (2018)
Pauline Bryan, Baroness Bryan of Partick
The Baron McNicol of West Kilbride (2018)
Iain McNicol, Baron McNicol of West Kilbride
The Baroness Barran (2018)
Diana Barran, Baroness Barran
The Baron Haselhurst (2018)
Alan Haselhurst, Baron Haselhurst
The Baron Garnier (2018)
Edward Garnier, Baron Garnier
The Baron Randall of Uxbridge (2018)
John Randall, Baron Randall of Uxbridge
The Baroness Boycott (2018)
Rosie Boycott, Baroness Boycott
The Baron Anderson of Ipswich (2018)
David Anderson, Baron Anderson of Ipswich
The Baroness Bull (2018)
Deborah Bull, Baroness Bull
The Baroness Osamor (2018)
Martha Osamor, Baroness Osamor
The Baroness Blackwood of North Oxford (2019)
Nicola Blackwood, Baroness Blackwood of North Oxford
The Baroness Bennett of Manor Castle (2019)
Natalie Bennett, Baroness Bennett of Manor Castle
The Baron Barwell (2019)
Gavin Barwell, Baron Barwell
The Baron Parkinson of Whitley Bay (2019)
Stephen Parkinson, Baron Parkinson of Whitley Bay
The Baroness Sanderson of Welton (2019)
Elizabeth Sanderson, Baroness Sanderson of Welton
The Baron Choudrey (2019)
Zameer Choudrey, Baron Choudrey
The Baron Brownlow of Shurlock Row (2019)
David Brownlow, Baron Brownlow of Shurlock Row
The Baron Davies of Gower (2019)
Byron Davies, Baron Davies of Gower
The Baroness Penn (2019)
Joanna Penn, Baroness Penn
The Baron Ranger (2019)
Rami Ranger, Baron Ranger
The Baroness Hallett (2019)
Heather Hallett, Baroness Hallett
The Baroness Wilcox of Newport (2019)
Debbie Wilcox, Baroness Wilcox of Newport
The Baron Woolley of Woodford (2019)
Simon Woolley, Baron Woolley of Woodford
The Baron Hendy (2019)
John Hendy, Baron Hendy
The Baroness Blower (2019)
Christine Blower, Baroness Blower
The Baroness Ritchie of Downpatrick (2019)
Margaret Ritchie, Baroness Ritchie of Downpatrick
The Baroness Hunt of Bethnal Green (2019)
Ruth Hunt, Baroness Hunt of Bethnal Green
The Baron Mann (2019)
John Mann, Baron Mann
The Baron Carter of Haslemere (2019)
Harold Carter, Baron Carter of Haslemere
The Baron Darroch of Kew (2019)
Kim Darroch, Baron Darroch of Kew
The Baroness Morgan of Cotes (2020)
Nicky Morgan, Baroness Morgan of Cotes
The Baron Goldsmith of Richmond Park (2020)
Zac Goldsmith, Baron Goldsmith of Richmond Park
The Baron Reed of Allermuir (2020)
Robert Reed, Baron Reed of Allermuir
The Baron Grimstone of Boscobel (2020)
Gerry Grimstone, Baron Grimstone of Boscobel
The Baron Greenhalgh (2020)
Stephen Greenhalgh, Baron Greenhalgh
The Baron Frost (2020)
David Frost, Baron Frost
The Baron Herbert of South Downs (2020)
Nick Herbert, Baron Herbert of South Downs
The Baron Vaizey of Didcot (2020)
Ed Vaizey, Baron Vaizey of Didcot
The Baron Wharton of Yarm (2020)
James Wharton, Baron Wharton of Yarm
The Baron Austin of Dudley (2020)
Ian Austin, Baron Austin of Dudley
The Baroness Morrissey (2020)
Helena Morrissey, Baroness Morrissey
The Baroness Clark of Kilwinning (2020)
Katy Clark, Baroness Clark of Kilwinning
The Baron Walney (2020)
John Woodcock, Baron Walney
The Baron Clarke of Nottingham (2020)
Kenneth Clarke, Baron Clarke of Nottingham
The Baroness Stuart of Edgbaston (2020)
Gisela Stuart, Baroness Stuart of Edgbaston
The Baroness Fullbrook (2020)
Lorraine Fullbrook, Baroness Fullbrook
The Baron Sarfraz (2020)
Aamer Sarfraz, Baron Sarfraz
The Baron McLoughlin (2020)
Patrick McLoughlin, Baron McLoughlin
The Baroness Hayman of Ullock (2020)
Sue Hayman, Baroness Hayman of Ullock
The Baron Moylan (2020)
Daniel Moylan, Baron Moylan
The Baron Botham (2020)
Ian Botham, Baron Botham
The Baron Sikka (2020)
Prem Sikka, Baron Sikka
The Baron Field of Birkenhead (2020)
Frank Field, Baron Field of Birkenhead
The Baron Sedwill (2020)
Mark Sedwill, Baron Sedwill
The Baroness Fox of Buckley (2020)
Claire Fox, Baroness Fox of Buckley
The Baroness Hoey (2020)
Kate Hoey, Baroness Hoey
The Baroness Fleet (2020)
Veronica Wadley, Baroness Fleet
The Baron Sharpe of Epsom (2020)
Andrew Sharpe, Baron Sharpe of Epsom
The Baron Lancaster of Kimbolton (2020)
Mark Lancaster, Baron Lancaster of Kimbolton
The Baron Mendoza (2020)
Neil Mendoza, Baron Mendoza
The Baron Moore of Etchingham (2020)
Charles Moore, Baron Moore of Etchingham
The Baron Spencer of Alresford (2020)
Michael Spencer, Baron Spencer of Alresford
The Baron Davies of Brixton (2020)
Bryn Davies, Baron Davies of Brixton
The Baron Dodds of Duncairn (2020)
Nigel Dodds, Baron Dodds of Duncairn
The Baroness Shafik (2020)
Minouche Shafik, Baroness Shafik
The Baron Hammond of Runnymede (2020)
Philip Hammond, Baron Hammond of Runnymede
The Baron Johnson of Marylebone (2020)
Jo Johnson, Baron Johnson of Marylebone
The Baroness Casey of Blackstock (2020)
Louise Casey, Baroness Casey of Blackstock
The Baron Woodley (2020)
Tony Woodley, Baron Woodley
The Baron Bellingham (2020)
Henry Bellingham, Baron Bellingham
The Baron Udny-Lister (2020)
Edward (Udny-)Lister, Baron Udny-Lister
The Baron Stewart of Dirleton (2020)
Keith Stewart, Baron Stewart of Dirleton
The Baron Lebedev (2020)
Evgeny Lebedev, Baron Lebedev
The Baron Etherton (2020)
Terence Etherton, Baron Etherton
The Baron Wolfson of Tredegar (2020)
David Wolfson, Baron Wolfson of Tredegar
The Baron Hannan of Kingsclere (2021)
Daniel Hannan, Baron Hannan of Kingsclere
The Baron Godson (2021)
Dean Godson, Baron Godson
The Baron Benyon (2021)
Richard Benyon, Baron Benyon
The Baroness Fraser of Craigmaddie (2021)
Stephanie Fraser, Baroness Fraser of Craigmaddie
The Baron McDonald of Salford (2021)
Simon McDonald, Baron McDonald of Salford
The Baron Cruddas (2021)
Peter Cruddas, Baron Cruddas
The Baron Kamall (2021)
Syed Kamall, Baron Kamall
The Baroness Merron (2021)
Gillian Merron, Baroness Merron
The Baron Parker of Minsmere (2021)
Andrew Parker, Baron Parker of Minsmere
The Baroness Foster of Oxton (2021)
Jacqueline Foster, Baroness Foster of Oxton
The Baroness Blake of Leeds (2021)
Judith Blake, Baroness Blake of Leeds
The Baroness Chapman of Darlington (2021)
Jenny Chapman, Baroness Chapman of Darlington
The Baron Coaker (2021)
Vernon Coaker, Baron Coaker
The Baron Khan of Burnley (2021)
Wajid Khan, Baron Khan of Burnley
The Baron Morse (2021)
Amyas Morse, Baron Morse
The Baroness Black of Strome (2021)
Sue Black, Baroness Black of Strome
The Baron Sentamu (2021)
John Sentamu, Baron Sentamu
The Baron Stevens of Birmingham (2021)
Simon Stevens, Baron Stevens of Birmingham
The Baroness Davidson of Lundin Links (2021)
Ruth Davidson, Baroness Davidson of Lundin Links
The Baron Offord of Garvel (2021)
Malcolm Offord, Baron Offord of Garvel
The Baron Harrington of Watford (2022)
Richard Harrington, Baron Harrington of Watford
The Baron Bellamy (2022)
Christopher Bellamy, Baron Bellamy
The Baroness Gohir (2022)
Shaista Gohir, Baroness Gohir
The Baroness Willis of Summertown (2022)
Katherine Willis, Baroness Willis of Summertown
The Baron Markham (2022)
Nick Markham, Baron Markham
The Baron Johnson of Lainston (2022)
Dominic Johnson, Baron Johnson of Lainston
The Baron Murray of Blidworth (2022)
Simon Murray, Baron Murray of Blidworth
The Baron Soames of Fletching (2022)
Nicholas Soames, Baron Soames of Fletching
The Baroness Taylor of Stevenage (2022)
Sharon Taylor, Baroness Taylor of Stevenage
The Baron Leong (2022)
Sonny Leong, Baron Leong
The Baroness Lea of Lymm (2022)
Ruth Lea, Baroness Lea of Lymm
The Baron Roberts of Belgravia (2022)
Andrew Roberts, Baron Roberts of Belgravia
The Baron Swire (2022)
Hugo Swire, Baron Swire
The Baron Verdirame (2022)
Guglielmo Verdirame, Baron Verdirame
The Baron Sahota (2022)
Kuldip Singh Sahota, Baron Sahota
The Baron Hintze (2022)
Michael Hintze, Baron Hintze
The Baroness Lawlor (2022)
Sheila Lawlor, Baroness Lawlor
The Baroness O'Neill of Bexley (2022)
Teresa O'Neill, Baroness O'Neill of Bexley
The Baroness Twycross (2022)
Fiona Twycross, Baroness Twycross
The Baroness Bray of Coln (2022)
Angie Bray, Baroness Bray of Coln
The Baroness Moyo (2022)
Dambisa Moyo, Baroness Moyo
The Baron Evans of Rainow (2022)
Graham Evans, Baron Evans of Rainow
The Baroness Foster of Aghadrumsee (2022)
Arlene Foster, Baroness Foster of Aghadrumsee
The Baron Weir of Ballyholme (2022)
Peter Weir, Baron Weir of Ballyholme
The Baron Jackson of Peterborough (2022)
Stewart Jackson, Baron Jackson of Peterborough
The Baron Hendy of Richmond Hill (2022)
Peter Hendy, Baron Hendy of Richmond Hill
The Baroness Lampard (2022)
Kate Lampard, Baroness Lampard
The Baroness Anderson of Stoke-on-Trent (2022)
Ruth Smeeth, Baroness Anderson of Stoke-on-Trent
The Baron Prentis of Leeds (2022)
Dave Prentis, Baron Prentis of Leeds
The Baron Peach (2022)
Stuart Peach, Baron Peach
The Baron Watson of Wyre Forest (2022)
Tom Watson, Baron Watson of Wyre Forest
The Baroness O'Grady of Upper Holloway (2022)
Frances O'Grady, Baroness O'Grady of Upper Holloway
The Baron Sewell of Sanderstead (2022)
Tony Sewell, Baron Sewell of Sanderstead

List of heirs of hereditary barons in the peerages of the British Isles

Heirs apparent

1.	Hon. Finbar Maxwell, eldest son of the Baron de Ros

2.	Hon. James Stourton, eldest son of the Baron Mowbray

3.	Hon. Jacob Astley, eldest son of the Baron Hastings

4.	Hon. Edward Plumptre, eldest son of the Baron FitzWalter

5.	Hon. Charles Clinton, eldest son of the Baron Clinton

6.	Hon. Thomas Frankland, eldest son of the Baron Zouche

7.	Hon. Hon. Arthur Beamish, eldest son of the Baroness Dacre

8.	Hon. Thomas Ingrams, eldest son of the Baron Darcy de Knayth

9.	Hon. David Bewicke-Copley, eldest son of the Baron Cromwell

10.	Hon. Ralph Thomas Stonor, eldest son of the Baron Camoys

11.	Hon. Richard Cornwall-Leigh, eldest son of the Baron Grey of Codnor

12.	Hon. Thomas Gueterbock, eldest son of the Baron Berkeley

13.	Hon. Drummond Money-Coutts, eldest son of the Baron Latymer

14.	Hon. Jeremy Wallace, eldest son of the Baron Dudley

15.	Hon. Martin Fiennes, eldest surviving son of the Baron Saye and Sele

16.	Hon. Edward Kirkham, eldest son of the Baron Berners

17.	Hon. Oliver Seyfried-Herbert, eldest son of the Baron Herbert

18.	Hon. Rupert Verney, eldest son of the Baron Willoughby de Broke

19.	Hon. Alexander Gilbey, eldest son of the Baron Vaux of Harrowden

20.	Hon. Alexander Leith, eldest son of the Baron Burgh

21.	Hon. Oliver St John, eldest son of the Baron St John of Bletso

22.	Hon. Peter Czermin, eldest son of the Baroness Howard de Walden

23.	Hon. Domonic Petre, eldest son of the Baron Petre

24.	Hon. Hugo Dormer, eldest son of the Baron Dormer

25.	Hon. Henry Roper-Curzon, eldest son of the Baron Teynham

26.	Hon. John Drummond, eldest son of the Baron Strange

27.	Hon. Benjamin FitzHerbert, eldest son of the Baron Stafford

28.	Hon. Charles Byron, eldest son of the Baron Byron

29.	Hon. Lewis Palmer, eldest son of the Baron Lucas and Lord Dingwall

30.	Hon. Patrick Forwood, eldest son of the Baroness Arlington

31.	Hon. Alexander Clifford, eldest son of the Baron Clifford of Chudleigh

32.	Hon. William Vane, eldest son of the Baron Barnard

33.	Hon. Neil Rorbes, Master of Forbes, eldest son of the Lord Forbes

34.	Hon. Alexander Campbell-Gray, Master of Gray, eldest son of the Lord Gray

35.	Hon. Harry St Clair, Master of Sinclair, eldest son of the Lord Sinclair

36.	Hon. Francis Sempill, Master of Sempill, eldest son of the Lord Sempill

37.	Hon. Jago Elphintone, Master of Elphinstone, eldest son of the Lord Elphinstone

38.	Hon. Edward Fairfax, eldest son of the Lord Fairfax of Cameron

39.	Hon. Alexander Mackay, Master of Reay, eldest son of the Lord Reay

40.	Hon. Robert Erskine-Murray, Master of Elibank, eldest son of the Lord Elibank

41.	Hon. William Hamilton, Master of Belhaven, eldest son of the Lord Belhaven and Stenton

42.	Hon. James Rollo, Master of Rollo, eldest son of the Lord Rollo

43.	Hon. William Hepburne-Scott, Master of Polwarth, eldest son of the Lord Polwarth

44.	Hon. James Willoughby, eldest son of the Baron Middleton

45.	Hon. Thomas Irby, eldest son of the Baron Boston

46.	Hon. Simon Vernon-Harcourt, eldest son of the Baron Vernon

47.	Hon. Henry Digby, eldest son of the Baron Digby

48.	Hon. Peregrin Cust, eldest son of the Baron Brownlow

49.	Hon. Robert de Grey, eldest son of the Baron Walsingham

50.	Hon. Charles FitxRoy, eldest son of the Baron Southampton

51.	Hon. Samuel Harbord-Hamond, eldest son of the Baron Suffield

52.	Hon. Nicholas Hovell-Thurlow-Cumming-Bruce, eldest son of the Baron Thurlow

53.	Hon. Robert Carington, eldest son of the Baron Carrington

54.	Hon. Thomas Orde-Powlett, eldest son of the Baron Bolton

55.	Hon. Matthew Plinkett, eldest son of the Baron Louth

56.	Hon. Domonic Evans-Freke, eldest son of the Baron Carbery

57.	Hon. Michael Aylmer, eldest son of the Baron Aylmer

58.	Hon. Robin Maxwell, eldest son of the Baron Farnham

59.	Hon. Somerled MacDonald, Younger of Sleat, eldest son of the Baron Macdonald

60.	Hon. William Edwardes, eldest son of the Baron Kensington

61.	Hon. John Massy, eldest son of the Baron Massy

62.	Hon. Jonathan Deane, eldest son of the Baron Muskerry

63.	Hon. Luke Cavendish, eldest son of the Baron Waterpark

64.	Hon. Gerald Vanneck, eldest son of the Baron Huntingfield

65.	Hon. William Hotham, eldest son of the Baron Hotham

66.	Hon. John Eden, eldest son of the Baron Henley and Northington

67.	Hon. Owain Rowley-Conway, eldest son of the Baron Langford

68.	Hon. Francis Blackwood, eldest son of the Baron Dufferin and Claneboye

69.	Hon. Edward Henniker-Major, eldest son of the Baron Henniker and Hartismere

70.	Hon. Francis Daubeney de Moleyns, eldest son of the Baron Ventry

71.	Hon. Joel Prittie, eldest son of the Baron Dunalley

72.	Hon. Timothy Trench, eldest son of the Baron Ashtown

73.	Hon. James Law, eldest son of the Baron Ellenborough

74.	Hon. John Manners, eldest son of the Baron Manners

75.	Hon. Ronan Handcock, eldest son of the Baron Castlemaine

76.	Hon. Robert Beresford, eldest son of the Baron Decies

77.	Hon. Stratford Canning, eldest son of the Baron Garvagh

78.	Hon. Henry Liddell, eldest son of the Baron Ravensworth

79.	Hugh Cholmondley, grandson of the Baron Delamere

80.	Hon. Brook Weld-Forester, eldest son of the Baron Forester

81.	Hon. John Strutt, eldest son of the Baron Rayleigh

82.	Hon. Thomas Gifford, eldest son of the Baron Gifford

83.	Hon. Orlando Duncombe, eldest son of the Baron Feversham

84.	Hon. Benjamin Ellis, eldest son of the Baron Seaford

85.	Hon. Rory Plunket, eldest son of the Baron Plunket

86.	Hon. Daniel Bootle-Wilbraham, eldest son of the Baron Skelmersdale

87.	Hon. Harry Best, eldest son of the Baron Wynford

88.	Hon. John Arundell, eldest son of the Baron Talbot of Malahide

89.	Hon. Simon Boyd, eldest son of the Baron Kilmarnock

90.	Hon. Henry Bampfylde, eldest son of the Baron Poltimore

91.	Hon. Robert Denman, eldest son of the Baron Denman

92.	Hon. William Connolly-Carew, eldest son of the Baron Carew

93.	Hon. Frederick Baring, eldest son of the Baron Ashburton

94.	Hon. Thomas Littleton, eldest son of the Baron Hatherton

95.	Hon. Victor Wrottesley, eldest son of the Baron Wrottesley

96.	Hon. Rupert Leigh, eldest son of the Baron Leigh

97.	Hon. Christopher Parnell, eldest son of the Baron Congleton

98.	Hon. Anthony Bellew, eldest son of the Baron Bellew

99.	Hon. James Denison, eldest son of the Baron Londesborough

100.	Hon. Alexander French, eldest son of the Baron de Freyne

101.	Inigo Somerset, grandson of the Baron Raglan

102.	Hon. Michael Strutt, eldest son of the Baron Belper

103.	Hon. Oliver Cavendish, eldest son of the Baron Chesham

104.	Hon. Joseph Yarde-Buller, eldest son of the Baron Churston

105.	Hon. George Wyndham, eldest son of the Baron Leconfield and Egremont

106.	Hon. Charles Brougham, eldest son of the Baron Brougham and Vaux

107.	Hon. Alexander Bethell, eldest son of the Baron Westbury

108.	Hon. Luke White, eldest son of the Baron Annaly

109.	Hon. William Jolliffe, eldest son of the Baron Hylton

110.	Hon. Edward Douglas-Pennant, eldest son of the Baron Penrhyn

111.	Hon. Shane O’Neill, eldest son of the Baron O'Neill

112.	Hon. James Napier, eldest son of the Baron Napier of Magdãla

113.	Hon. William McClintock-Bunbury, eldest son of the Baron Rathdonnell

114.	Hon. Edward Mansfield, eldest son of the Baron Sandhurst

115.	Hon. Hector Bruce, eldest son of the Baron Aberdare

116.	Hon. Harry Moncreiff, eldest son of the Baron Moncreiff

117.	Hon. James Coleridge, eldest son of the Baron Coleridge

118.	Hon. Thomas Fremantle, eldest son of the Baron Cottesloe

119.	Hon. Charles Pakington, eldest son of the Baron Hampton

120.	Hon. Ralph Tollemache, eldest son of the Baron Tollemache

121.	Hon. Rupert Gerard, eldest son of the Baron Gerard

122.	Hon. Arthur Sackville-West, eldest son of the Baron Sackville

123.	Hon. Edward Adderley, eldest son of the Baron Norton

124.	Hon. Francis Vanden-Bempde-Johnstone, eldest son of the Baron Derwent

125.	Hon. William Tufton, eldest son of the Baron Hothfield

126.	Hon. Ben Dodson, eldest son of the Baron Monk Bretton

127.	Hon. Henry James, eldest son of the Baron Northbourne

128.	Hon. Nathaniel Rothschild, eldest son of the Baron Rothschild

129.	Hon. James Collier, eldest son of the Baron Monkswell

130.	Hon. Edward Gibson, eldest son of the Baron Ashbourne

131.	Hon. Rowland Winn, eldest son of the Baron St Oswald

132.	Hon. Henry Allsop, eldest son of the Baron Hindlip

133.	Hon. Harry Becket, Eldest son of the Baron Grimthorpe

134.	Hon. Francis Hamilton, eldest son of the Baron Hamilton of Dalzell

135.	Hon. Hugh St Aubyn, eldest son of the Baron St Levan

136.	Hon. Luke Sclater-Booth, eldest son of the Baron Basing

137.	Hon. Frederick Fellowes, eldest son of the Baron de Ramsey

138.	Hon. Richard Cubitt, eldest son of the Baron Ashcombe

139.	Hon. Jack Cecil, eldest son of the Baron Amherst of Hackney

140.	Hon. Piers Legh, eldest son of the Baron Newton

141.	Hon. Andrew Mulholland, eldest son of the Baron Dunleath

142.	Hon. James Vivian, eldest son of the Baron Swansea

143.	Hon. Humphrey Gibbs, eldest son of the Baron Aldenham and Hunsden

144.	Hon. James Baillie, eldest son of the Baron Burton

145.	Hon. Charles Bailey, eldest son of the Baron Glanusk

146.	Hon. Sacha Gurdon, eldest son of the Baron Cranworth

147.	Hon. Alexander Lubbock, eldest son of the Baron Avebury

148.	Hon. Luke Morris, eldest son of the Baron Killanin

149.	Hon. Angus Howard, eldest son of the Baron Strathcona and Mount Royal

150.	Hon. Alan Balfour, eldest son of the Baron Kinross

151.	Hon. Thomas Kay-Shuttleworth, eldest son of the Baron Shuttleworth

152.	Hon. Bertram Mitford, eldest son of the Baron Redesdale

153.	Hon. Robert Biddulph, eldest son of the Baron Biddulph

154.	Hon. Sebastian Ritchie, eldest son of the Baron Ritchie of Dundee

155.	Hon. Richard Martyn-Hemphill, eldest son of the Baron Hemphill

156.	Hon. William Joicey, eldest son of the Baron Joicey

157.	Hon. Charles Wilson, eldest son of the Baron Nunburnholme

158.	Hon. Hugo Blyth, eldest son of the Baron Blyth

159.	Hon. Leon Whiteley, eldest son of the Baron Marchamley

160.	Hon. Oliver Barnes, eldest son of the Baron Gorell

161.	Hon. Benjamin Fisher, eldest surviving son of the Baron Fisher

162.	Hon. James Godley, eldest son of the Baron Kilbracken

163.	Hon. Charles McLaren, eldest son of the Baron Aberconway

164.	Hon. Jason Corbett, eldest son of the Baron Rowallan

165.	Hon. Edward Hope-Morley, eldest son of the Baron Hollenden

166.	Hon. Henry Cripps, eldest son of the Baron Parmoor

167.	Hon. Henry Cunliffe, eldest son of the Baron Cunliffe

168.	Hon. Jamie Buckley, eldest son of the Baron Wrenbury

169.	Hon. James Henderson, eldest son of the Baron Faringdon

170.	Hon. John Crossley, eldest son of the Baron Somerleyton

171.	Hon. Thomas Nicolson, eldest son of the Baron Carnock

172.	Hon. Maxwell Aitken, eldest son of the Baron Beaverbrook

173.	Hon. Adrian Pease, eldest son of the Baron Gainford

174.	Hon. Alexander Dewer, eldest son of the Baron Forteviot

175.	Hon. Craig Hamilton-Smith, eldest son of the Baron Colwyn

176.	Hon. Peregrine Chaloner, eldest son of the Baron Gisborough

177.	Hon. William Cawley, eldest son of the Baron Cawley

178.	Hon. Jack Woodhouse, eldest son of the Baron Terrington

179.	Hon. Edward Arthur, eldest son of the Baron Glenarthur

180.	Hon. Tristan Phillimore, eldest son of the Baron Phillimore

181.	Hon. Benjamin Weir, eldest son of the Baron Inverforth

182.	Hon. Thomas Cochrane, eldest son of the Baron Cochrane of Cults

183.	Hon. John Roberts, eldest son of the Baron Clwyd

184.	Hon. Edward Russell, eldest son of the Baron Russell of Liverpool

185.	Hon. Thomas Meston, eldest son of the Baron Meston

186.	Hon. Oliver Lawrence, eldest son of the Baron Trevethin and Oaksey

187.	Hon. Thomas Watson, eldest son of the Baron Manton

188.	Hon. George Williamson, eldest son of the Baron Forres

189.	Hon. Samuel Vestey, eldest son of the Baron Vestey

190.	Hon. Edwin Borwick, eldest son of the Baron Borwick

191.	Hon. Joseph Maclay, eldest son of the Baron Maclay

192.	Hon. Jacob Bethell, eldest son of the Baron Bethell

193.	Hon. Robert Darling, eldest son of the Baron Darling

194.	Hon. Thomas Duke, eldest son of the Baron Merrivale

195.	Hon. John Bradbury, eldest son of the Baron Bradbury

196.	Hon. Thomas Chubb, eldest son of the Baron Hayter

197.	Hon. Fiennes Cornwallis, eldest son of the Baron Cornwallis

198.	Hon. Thomas Greenall, eldest son of the Baron Daresbury

199.	Hon. Orlando Gibbs, eldest son of the Baron Wraxall

200.	Hon. Edward Remnant, eldest son of the Baron Remnant

201.	Hon. Nicholas Moynihan, eldest son of the Baron Moynihan

202.	Hon. Alexander Shaw, eldest son of the Baron Craigmyle

203.	Hon. Robert Wills, eldest son of the Baron Dulverton

204.	Hon. Samuel Lawson Johnson, eldest son of the Baron Luke

205.	Hon. Robert Yerburgh, eldest son of the Baron Alvingham

206.	Hon. David Baden-Powell, brother of the Baron Baden-Powell

207.	Hon. Cameron Ponsonby, eldest son of the Baron Ponsonby of Shulbrede

208.	Hon. Thomas Howard, eldest son of the Baron Howard of Penrith

209.	Hon. Daniel Lamb, eldest son of the Baron Rochester

210.	Hon. Callum Mitchell-Thomson, eldest son of the Baron Selsdon

211.	Hon. Valentine Guinness, eldest surviving son of the Baron Moyne

212.	Hon. David Davies, eldest son of the Baron Davies

213.	Hon. Charlie Hope, eldest son of the Baron Rankeillour

214.	Hon. Alexander Nall-Cain, eldest son of the Baron Brocket

215.	Hon. Edward Iliffe, eldest son of the Baron Iliffe

216.	Hon. Hugo Palmer, eldest son of the Baron Palmer

217.	Hon. William Cecil, eldest son of the Baron Rockley

218.	Hon. Edward Elton, eldest son of the Baron Elton

219.	Hon. Frederick Fermor-Hesketh, eldest son of the Baron Hesketh

220.	Hon. John Buchan, eldest son of the Baron Tweedsmuir

221.	Hon. Harry Wigram, eldest son of the Baron Wigram

222.	Hon. Archibald Young, eldest son of the Baron Kennet

223.	Hon. Rory MacPherson, eldest son of the Baron Strathcarron

224.	Hon. George Hennessy, eldest son of the Baron Windlesham

225.	Hon. Arthur Mancroft, eldest son of the Baron Mancroft

226.	Hon. Ivan Rea, eldest son of the Baron Rea

227.	Hon. Nicholas Cadman, eldest son of the Baron Cadman

228.	Hon. William Siddeley, eldest son of the Baron Kenilworth

229.	Hon. Miles Denison-Pender, eldest son of the Baron Pender

230.	Hon. Henry Lopes, eldest son of the Baron Roborough

231.	Hon. Christian Brassey, eldest son of the Baron Brassey of Apethorpe

232.	Hon. Leo Stamp, eldest son of the Baron Stamp

233.	Hon. Milo Louis Vivian Smith, son of the Baron Bicester

234.	Hon. Archie Philipps, eldest son of the Baron Milford

235.	Hon. Domonic Harmsworth, eldest son of the Baron Harmsworth

236.	Hon. Herbert Cayzer, eldest son of the Baron Rotherwick

237.	Hon. Daniel Dixon, eldest son of the Baron Glentoran

238.	Hon. Guy Tryon, eldest son of the Baron Tryon

239.	Hon. Charles Kerr, eldest son of the Baron Teviot

240.	Hon. Alasdair Nathan, Eldest son of the Baron Nathan

241.	Hon. Harry Reith, eldest son of the Baron Reith

242.	Hon. Frederick Kindersley, eldest son of the Baron Kindersley

243.	Hon. Frederick Ironside, eldest son of the Baron Ironside

244.	Hon. Josiah Wedgwood, eldest son of the Baron Wedgwood

245.	Hon. James Geddes, eldest son of the Baron Geddes

246.	Hon. John Warrender, eldest son of the Baron Bruntisfield

247.	Hon. Benjamin Moore-Brabazon, eldest son of the Baron Brabazon of Tara

248.	Hon. Frederick Herbert, eldest son of the Baron Hemingford

249.	Hon. David Wilson, eldest son of the Baron Moran

250.	Hon. Miles Lampson, eldest son of the Baron Killearn

251.	Hon. John Gretton, eldest son of the Baron Gretton

252.	Hon. Arthur Hazlerigg, eldest son of the Baron Hazlerigg

253.	Hon. Douglas Hacking, eldest son of the Baron Hacking

254.	Hon. Roger Chetwode, eldest son of the Baron Chetwode

255.	Hon. Devon Edmondson, eldest son of the Baron Sandford

256.	Hon. Edward Grigg, eldest son of the Baron Altrincham

257.	Hon. Mark Broadbridge, eldest son of the Baron Broadbridge

258.	Hon. Alexander Evans, eldest son of the Baron Mountevans

259.	Hon. Patrick Chorley, eldest son of the Baron Chorley

260.	Hon. Jonathan Muff, eldest son of the Baron Calverley

261.	Hon. Benjamin Tedder, eldest son of the Baron Tedder

262.	Hon. Thomas Campbell, eldest son of the Baron Colgrain

263.	Hon. John Lucas, eldest son of the Baron Lucas of Chilworth

264.	Hon. Patrick Shepherd, eldest son of the Baron Shepherd

265.	Hon. Richard Newall, eldest son of the Baron Newall

266.	Hon. Timothy Maffey, eldest son of the Baron Rugby

267.	Hon. John Kershaw, eldest son of the Baron Kershaw

268.	Hon. William Trefgarne, eldest son of the Baron Trefgarne

269.	Hon. Matthew Crook, eldest son of the Baron Crook

270.	Hon. Ian Montague, eldest son of the Baron Amwell

271.	Hon. Richard Colville, eldest son of the Baron Clydesmuir

272.	Hon. Tudor Rees-Williams, eldest son of the Baron Ogmore

273.	Hon. Benjamin Morris, eldest son of the Baron Morris of Kenwood

274.	Hon. Daniel Macpherson, eldest son of the Baron Macpherson of Drumochter

275.	Hon. Joseph Freyberg, eldest son of the Baron Freyberg

276.	Hon. Thomas Wise, eldest son of the Baron Wise

277.	Hon. Arthur Jeffreys, eldest son of the Baron Jeffreys

278.	Hon. Francois O’Neill, eldest son of the Baron Rathcavan

279.	Hon. Robert Baillieu, eldest son of the Baron Baillieu

280.	Hon. Jesse Suenson-Taylor, eldest son of the Baron Grantchester

281.	Hon. John Harvey, eldest son of the Baron Harvey of Tasburgh

282.	Hon. Carl Gridley, eldest son of the Baron Gridley

283.	Hon. William Fraser, eldest son of the Baron Strathalmond

284.	Hon. Ralph Assheton, eldest son of the Baron Clitheroe

285.	Hon. James Hopkinson, eldest son of the Baron Colyton

286.	Hon. Charles Astor, eldest son of the Baron Astor of Hever

287.	Hon. Miles Bridges, eldest son of the Baron Bridges

288.	Hon. Mark Norrie, eldest son of the Baron Norrie

289.	Hon. Angus Harding, eldest son of the Baron Harding of Petherton

290.	Hon. Oliver Poole, eldest son of the Baron Poole

291.	Hon. Andrew Turner, eldest son of the Baron Netherthorpe

292.	Hon. Thomas Dugdale, eldest son of the Baron Crathorne

293.	Hon. Peter Spens, eldest son of the Baron Spens

294.	Hon. Archie MacAndrew, eldest son of the Baron MacAndrew

295.	Hon. David Baring, eldest son of the Baron Howick of Glendale

296.	Hon. Michael Sanderson, eldest son of the disclaimed Baron Sanderson of Ayot

297.	Hon. Edward Lytton-Cobbold, eldest son of the Baron Cobbold

298.	Hon. Michael Marks, eldest son of the Baron Marks of Broughton

299.	Hon. James Broughton, eldest son of the Baron Fairhaven

300.	Hon. Thomas Brain, eldest son of the Baron Brain

301.	Hon. Philip Low, eldest son of the Baron Aldington

302.	Hon. Jake Millar, eldest son of the Baron Inchyra

303.	Hon. Benjamin Thomson, eldest son of the Baron Thomson of Fleet

304.	Hon. James Robinson, eldest son of the Baron Martonmere

305.	Hon. Henry Fletcher-Vane, eldest son of the Baron Inglewood

306.	Hon. Henry Hughes-Young, eldest son of the Baron St Helens

307.	Hon. Declan Morrison, eldest son of the Baron Margadale

Heirs presumptive

1.	Miles Russell, nephew of the Baron de Clifford

2.	Sebastian Miller and Sir John Aird, 4th Baronet, co-heirs of the Baroness Willoughby de Eresby

3.	Hamish Kenworthy, third cousin of the Baron Strabolgi

4.	Linda Fothergill, second cousin of the Baroness Braye

5.	Hon. Meghan Robertson, daughter of the Baron Wharton

6.	Hon. Katharine Fraser, Mistress of Saltoun, daughter of the Lady Saltoun

7.	Hon. James Borthwick of Glengelt, Master of Borthwick, brother of the Lord Borthwick

8.	Hon. Jack Fraser, Master of Lovat, brother of the Lord Lovat

9.	Lady Clare Hurd, daughter of the Lady Herries of Terregles

10.	Robert Sandilands, first cousin twice removed of the Lord Torphichen

11.	Hon. Hester Haworth, Mistriss of Kinloss, sister of the Lady Kinloss

12.	Hon. Sophie Napier, Mistress of Napier, daughter of the Lord Napier

13.	Hon. Laetitia Bruce-Winkler, Mistress of Burleigh, daughter of the Lady Balfour of Burleigh

14. Hon. Benedict Walpole, brother of the Baron Walpole.

15.	Hon. Andrew Monson, brother of the Baron Monson

16.	Rupert Foley, sixth cousin of the Baron Foley

17.	Robert Rhys, second cousin of the Baron Dynevor

18.	Richard Bagot, second cousin once removed of the Baron Bagot

19.	Hon. Francis Norton, brother of the Baron Grantley

20.	Nicholas Rodney, first cousin once removed of the Baron Rodney

21.	Martin Cocks, fourth cousin twice removed of the Baron Somers

22.	Hon. Alexander Tyrell-Kenyon, brother of the Baron Kenyon

23.	John Neville, uncle of the Baron Braybrooke

24.	Henry Eden, first cousin of the Baron Auckland

25.	Robert Powys, second cousin once removed of the Baron Lilford

26.	Joseph de Courcy, kinsman of the Baron Kingsale

27.	Hon. Oliver Plunkett, brother of the Baron Dunsany

28.	Michael Butler, second cousin once removed of the Baron Dunboyne

29.	Conor O’Brien, second cousin of the Baron Inchiquin

30.	Hon. David Lysaght, brother of the Baron Lisle

31.	Anthony Wynn, first cousin of the Baron Newborough

32.	Hon. Charles Stanley, brother of the Baron Stanley of Alderley, Baron Sheffield and Baron Eddisbury

33.	Rev. Aubrey Browne, fifth cousin once removed of the Baron Kilmaine

34.	Hon. Charles Crofton, brother of the Baron Crofton

35.	Robert Bingham, second cousin of the Baron Clanmorris

36.	Hon. Peter Thellusson, uncle of the Baron Rendlesham

37.	Hon. David Spencer, brother of the Baron Churchill

38.	Rear-Admiral Michael Harris, kinsman of the Baron Harris

39.	Peter Holmes á Court, kinsman of the Baron Heytesbury

40.	Roger Lloyd-Mostyn, third cousin twice removed of the Baron Mostyn

41.	Hon. Victor Saumarez, brother of the Baron de Saumarez

42.	Harry Scarlett, nephew of the Baron Abinger

43.	Shaun Browne, nephew of the Baron Oranmore and Browne and Baron Mereworth

44.	Hon. George Ponsonby, brother of the Baron de Mauley

45.	Nicholas Hanbury-Tracy, second cousin twice removed of the Baron Sudeley

46.	Thomas Methuen-Campbell, half-brother of the Baron Methuen

47.	Hon. Michael Rice, uncle of the Baron Monteagle of Brandon

48.	Thomas Vivian, first cousin of the Baron Vivian

49.	Hon. Edmund Roche, brother of the Baron Fermoy

50.	Hon. Robert Vernon, uncle of the Baron Lyveden

51.	Hon. Robert Lyon-Dalberg-Acton, uncle of the Baron Acton

52.	Hon. Jonathan Glyn, half-brother of the Baron Wolverton

53.	Hon. Richard Strachey, brother of the Baron O'Hagan

54. Hon. Nicholas Alexander John Napier, brother of the Baron Ettrick

55.	Hon. Iain Hill-Trevor, brother of the Baron Trevor

56.	Hon. Anthony Russell, brother of the Baron Ampthill

57.	Alan Tennyson, brother of the Baron Tennyson

58.	Hon. Michael Grant of Grant, brother of the Baron Strathspey

59.	Hon. Thomas Baring, eldest son of the Baron Revelstoke

60.	Hon. Jonathan Douglas-Scott-Montagu, half-brother of the Baron Montagu of Beaulieu

61.	Hon. Michael Hubbard, brother of the Baron Addington

62.	Hon. James Lumley-Savile, half-brother of the Baron Savile

63.	Edward Brooks, nephew of the Baron Crawshaw

64.	Hon. Ion Hamilton, brother of the Baron Holmpatrick

65.	Richard Grenfell, first cousin of the Baron Grenfell

66.	Rupert Montagu, first cousin of the Baron Swaythling

67.	Hon. Hugh Hardinge, brother of the Baron Hardinge of Penshurst

68.	Euan Tennant, first cousin of the Baron Glenconner

69.	Hon. Peter Lewis, uncle of the Baron Merthyr

70.	Hon. John Ashton, brother of the Baron Ashton of Hyde

71.	Hon. Matthew Mosley, brother of the Baron Ravensdale

72. David Shaughnessy, brother of the Baron Shaughnessy

73.	Hon. Adam Norton, brother of the Baron Rathcreedan

74.	Hon. James Morris, brother of the Baron Morris

75.	Hon. Dilip Sinha, brother of the Baron Sinha

76.	Nicholas Greenway, nephew of the Baron Greenway

77.	Hon. Andrew Dickinson, brother of Baron Dickinson

78.	Hon. Simon Noel-Buxton, uncle of the Baron Noel-Buxton

79.	Hon. Iain Milne, brother of the Baron Milne

80.	Hon. Richard Seely, brother of the Baron Mottistone

81.	Jan Loder, cousin of the Baron Wakehurst

82.	Hon. David Balfour, uncle of the Baron Riverdale

83.	Hon. Alexander Catto, brother of the Baron Catto

84.	Hon. Domonic McGowan, brother of the Baron McGowan

85. Hon. Henry Bowyer, brother of the Baron Denham

86.	Hon. Alexander Hankey, brother of the Baron Hankey

87.	Hon. Anthony Latham, brother of the Baron Latham

88.	Hon. Leopold Keyes, brother of the Baron Keyes

89.	Hon. Mark Dowding, brother of the Baron Dowding

90.	Hon. Alistair Westwood, brother of the Baron Westwood

91.	Simon Lindsay, first cousin once-removed of the Baron Lindsay of Birker

92.	Hon. Mark Piercy, brother of the Baron Piercy

93.	Hon. Benjamin Davies, brother of the Baron Darwen

94.	Jonathan Layton, first cousin of the Baron Layton

95.	Michael Simon, first cousin once removed of the Baron Simon of Wythenshawe

96.	Hon. Michael Richards, brother of the Baron Milverton

97.	Hon. Fraser Burden, brother of the Baron Burden

98.	Hon. Nicholas Haden-Guest, brother of the Baron Haden-Guest

99. Rory Silken, first cousin of the disclaimed Baron Silkin

100. Hon. James Kirkwood, brother of the Baron Kirkwood

101. Hon. Andrew Law, uncle of the Baron Coleraine

102. Hon. Charles Galbraith, brother of the Baron Strathclyde

103. Hon. William McNair, brother of the Baron McNair

104. William Rootes, first cousin of the Baron Rootes

105. Hon. James Nelson, uncle of the Baron Nelson of Stafford

106. Hon. Simon Seager, brother of the Baron Leighton of St Mellons

107. Hon. Peter Eve, uncle of the Baron Silsoe

108. Hon. Gerald Grimston, brother of the Baron Grimston of Westbury

109. Hon. Michael Renwick, brother of the Baron Renwick

Baronies without heirs

See also
British nobility
List of baronies in the peerages of Britain and Ireland

Notes on precedence

 
Baronies
Baronies
Peerages in the United Kingdom